= List of public art in Pimlico =

This is a list of public art in Pimlico, a district in the City of Westminster, London.

Image	Title / subject	Location and coordinates	Date	Artist / designer	Architect / other	Type	Designation	Notes
More images	Statue of William Huskisson	Pimlico Gardens 51.4856°N 0.1334°W	1836	John Gibson	—N/a	Statue	Grade II	Commissioned for a site outside the Custom House in Liverpool. This was Gibson's second version of the statue originally in Huskisson's mausoleum in St James Cemetery, Liverpool (now in the Walker Art Gallery). Moved to the Royal Exchange before coming to the present site in 1915.
More images	St Saviour's War Memorial	St Saviour's Church, Lupus Street 51.4885°N 0.1355°W	after 1918	?	—N/a	Calvary	Grade II	Commemorates parishioners who died in both World Wars.
	Dolphin mosaic	Dolphin Square	c. 1937	?	—N/a	Mosaic	—N/a	This mosaic, which has been described as having a "Hellenic" appearance, was originally situated at the main entrance of the Dolphin Square development but was moved to its present location during renovation work.
More images	Spot motif	Pimlico tube station platforms	c. 1972	Peter Sedgley	—N/a	Tiled pattern	—N/a	The motif of yellow spray bursts on a white background was inspired by Sedgley's own op art painting of 1968, Go.
More images	Cooling Tower Panels	Bessborough Street, Drummond Gate 51.4892°N 0.1330°W	1979–1982	Eduardo Paolozzi	Whitfield Partners	Sculpture	Grade II	Paolozzi's cast iron relief panels, painted in aluminium, encase the cooling equipment for the air conditioning of Pimlico tube station. Conceived as a "pivot or 'marker'" on the route from the tube station to the Tate Gallery, it was described by the architects as "an opportunity to transform a mechanical necessity into a genuine sculpture". Commissioned by the Crown Estate Commissioners.
More images	The Queen Mother's Commemorative Fountain	Bessborough Gardens 51.4885°N 0.1304°W	1980	Peter Shepheard	—N/a	Fountain	—N/a	A fountain in aluminium based on a cast of a George John Vulliamy streetlamp base from the Thames Embankment featuring two sturgeon.
	Dolphin Fountain	Dolphin Square 51.4864°N 0.1362°W	1987	James Butler	—N/a	Fountain with sculptural group	—N/a	Installed to mark the 50th anniversary of the building of Dolphin Square.
More images	Statue of Thomas Cubitt	Denbigh Street 51.4886°N 0.1387°W	1994–1995	William Fawke	—N/a	Statue	—N/a	The site is adjacent to that of the workshops used by Cubitt in the building of Pimlico. He is shown with a yardstick in hand, selecting a brick to measure from underneath the tarpaulin. Another cast of the statue is in Dorking, Surrey.
More images	The Helmsman	Pimlico Gardens 51.4854°N 0.1345°W	1996	André Wallace	—N/a	Sculpture	—N/a	Wallace is primarily interested in subjects involving journeys or transportation. This sculpture, of a figure at the helm of a boat, was the winning entry in a competition between five artists; it was felt to reflect the area's maritime history.
More images	River Cut Tide	Crown Reach Riverside Walk 51.4859°N 0.1323°W	2002	Paul Mason	—N/a	Sculpture	—N/a	Part of the Tyburn Group commemorating the River Tyburn, the western branch of which joined the Thames near this spot.
	Shorelines	Crown Reach Riverside Walk	2002	Paul Mason	—N/a	Relief	—N/a	Part of the Tyburn Group, this circular relief is affixed to a wall of the left-hand block of Eagle Wharf.
	Tyburn–Thames	Crown Reach Riverside Walk	2002	Paul Mason	—N/a	Slate plaque	—N/a	Part of the Tyburn Group, this plaque lists significant place names along the course of the River Tyburn.
	The Thames Stone and Negative Fall	Grosvenor Waterside	2006	Ekkehard Altenburger	—N/a	Water feature	—N/a	Rainwater collected from surrounding buildings is pumped up so as to flow along a representation of the River Thames's course carved in black Angola granite.
	Façades of Bramah House	Grosvenor Waterside	2008	Clare Woods	MAKE Architects	Mural	—N/a	A semi-abstract design showing trees and the chimney of a nearby former pumping station, etched onto anodised aluminium cladding.
More images	Roller Skater	Vauxhall Bridge Road 51.4909°N 0.1343°W	2010	André Wallace	—N/a	Sculpture	—N/a	The artist wished to make a sculpture "that would be positive and dynamic and reflect the youth and vitality of an urban street."
More images	Shack Stack	Grosvenor Waterside	2010	Richard Wilson	—N/a	Sculpture	—N/a	A sculpture in aluminium inspired by the ramshackle nature of the sheds often found in British allotments.

== Bibliography ==
- Bradley, Simon; Pevsner, Nikolaus (2003). London 6: Westminster. The Buildings of England. London and New Haven: Yale University Press. ISBN 978-0-300-09595-1.
- Cavanagh, Terry (2023). Public Sculpture of Kensington and Chelsea with Westminster South-West. Public Sculpture of Britain. Vol. 22. Watford: Public Statues and Sculpture Association. ISBN 978-1-8383976-2-3.
- Glinert, Ed (2012). The London Compendium: A Street-by-Street Exploration of the Hidden Metropolis. London: Penguin. ISBN 978-0-718-19204-4.
- Hibbert, Christopher; Weinreb, Ben; Keay, John; Keay, Julia (2011). The London Encyclopaedia (3rd ed.). Macmillan. ISBN 9780230738782.
- Paolozzi, Eduardo (1984). Robinson, Marlee (ed.). Eduardo Paolozzi: Private Vision—Public Art. London: Architectural Association Publications. ISBN 978-0904503500.
- Westminster City Council (23 October 2008). Conservation Area Audit & Management Proposals: Dolphin Square (PDF). Archived from the original (PDF) on 9 August 2014.
