= Pimlico Gardens =

Public park in central London

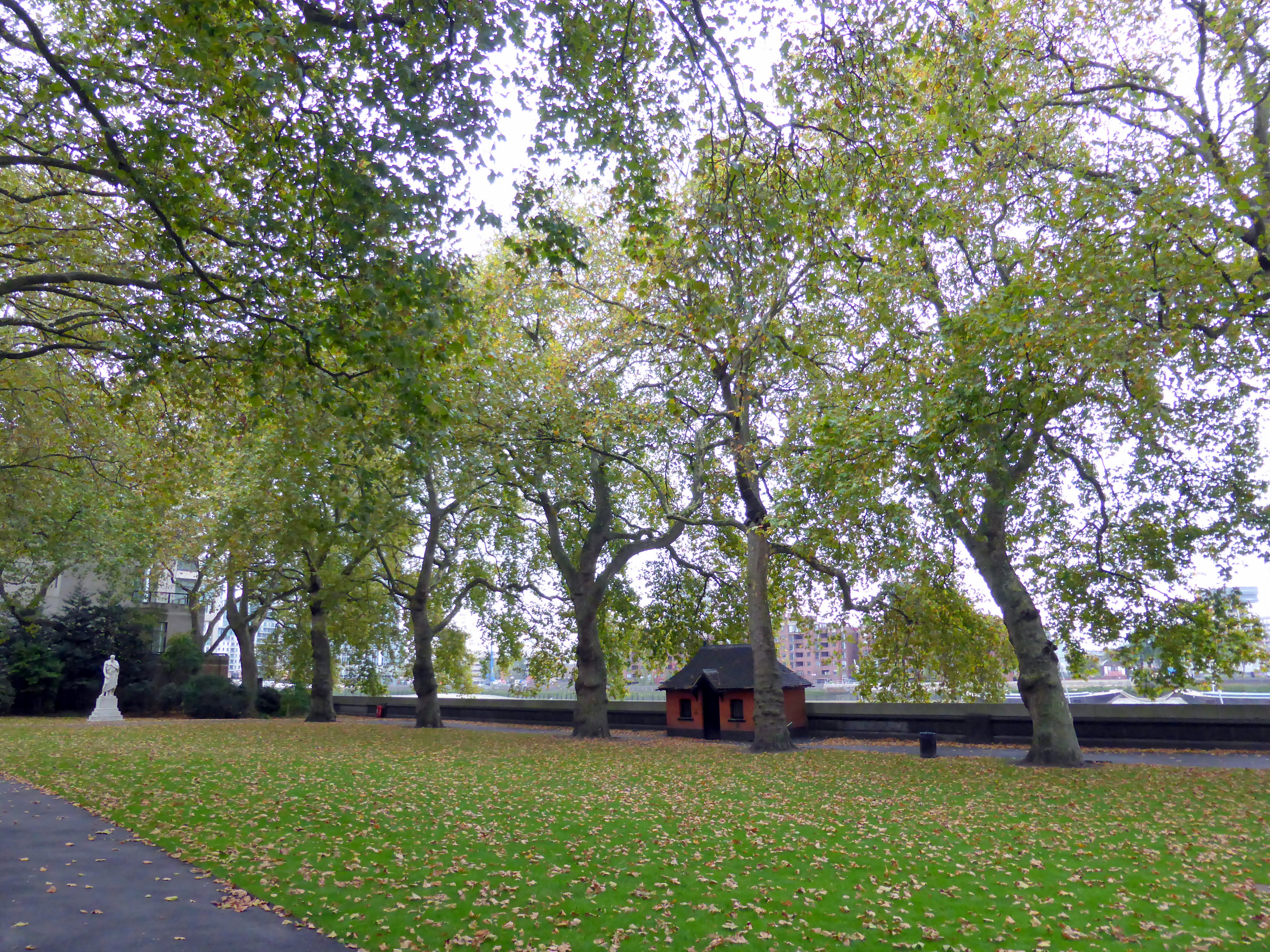
- The parkkeeper's cottage centre, statue of Huskisson to the left and the River Thames behind
- Interactive map of Pimlico Gardens
- Location: London, SW1V; United Kingdom
- Coordinates: 51.4856°N 0.1335°W
- Area: 0.6 hectares (1.5 acres)
- Public transit: Pimlico tube station

Pimlico Gardens is a 0.6 hectares (1.5 acres) public park in Pimlico, London, England. It is bordered to the north by Grosvenor Road and to the south by the River Thames. In the 19th century the area was a boarding point for boats on the Thames. In 1915, the site was detached from St George's Square Gardens, to which it had previously been allied, and designated as a public park. The park contains a statue commemorating William Huskisson, politician and reputedly the world's first railway accident fatality, after he was hit by Stephenson's Rocket in 1830. In 2023, Westminster City Council completed a consultation, as a first stage to the redevelopment of the park. The gardens are listed at Grade II on the Register of Historic Parks and Gardens of Special Historic Interest in England.

== History and description ==
The area of Pimlico was largely the creation of Thomas Cubitt (1788 – 1855), a highly successful builder and speculator who developed much of Belgravia for his patron, Richard Grosvenor, 2nd Marquess of Westminster: "No other developer had such absolute control over such a large area of London". Having gained building rights by the 1820s, at Cubitt's death in 1855 the street layout of the area was completed and roughly half of the intended housing stock was finished. At this time, the area of Pimlico Gardens was incorporated into St George's Square Gardens to the north, and offered a landing stage on the River Thames for boats and steamers. In 1874, the site was renamed Pimlico Gardens, and in 1915 it was formally redesignated as a public park. In the Second World War the central area of the gardens was converted into an allotment for the growing of vegetables as part of the Dig On for Victory campaign.

The park is managed by Westminster City Council which inaugurated a consultation in 2022, prior to redevelopment of the park to better support local residents. The plans include converting the gardener's hut into a cafe, the construction of toilet facilities, and the building over a viewing platform over the river. It is open to the public daily from 8:00 a.m. to dusk. The gardens are listed at Grade II on the Register of Historic Parks and Gardens of Special Historic Interest in England.

The gardens are rectangular in shape and consist of a central grassy area surrounded by paths with two rows of plane trees running east to west on the road and river sides of the park. In the centre, on the river side, stands a small gardener’s hut. At the eastern end is a statue of William Huskisson. Huskisson was a successful Member of Parliament who in 1830 sat for the constituency of Liverpool. As such, he attended the Opening of the Liverpool and Manchester Railway in September of that year. A series of unfortunate misjudgements saw him fall into the path of Stephenson's Rocket and he was fatally injured, reputedly the first such rail accident fatality in the world. (Note: It is now generally accepted that Huskisson's was the first widely-reported rail accident fatality, with at least one earlier death being recorded.) The statue in Pimlico Gardens was the second such tribute commissioned by Huskisson's widow, Emily, and undertaken by John Gibson. Originally intended to stand in Liverpool, it was instead offered to Lloyd's of London which placed it in the Royal Exchange in 1848. In 1915, it was offered to London County Council which erected it in the new public park at Pimlico. The statue is a Grade II listed structure. A modern sculpture, The Helmsman by André Wallace was erected at the other end of the gardens in 1996. (Note: Pevsner, and other sources, misdescribe André Wallace as Andrew Wallace.)

== Gallery ==
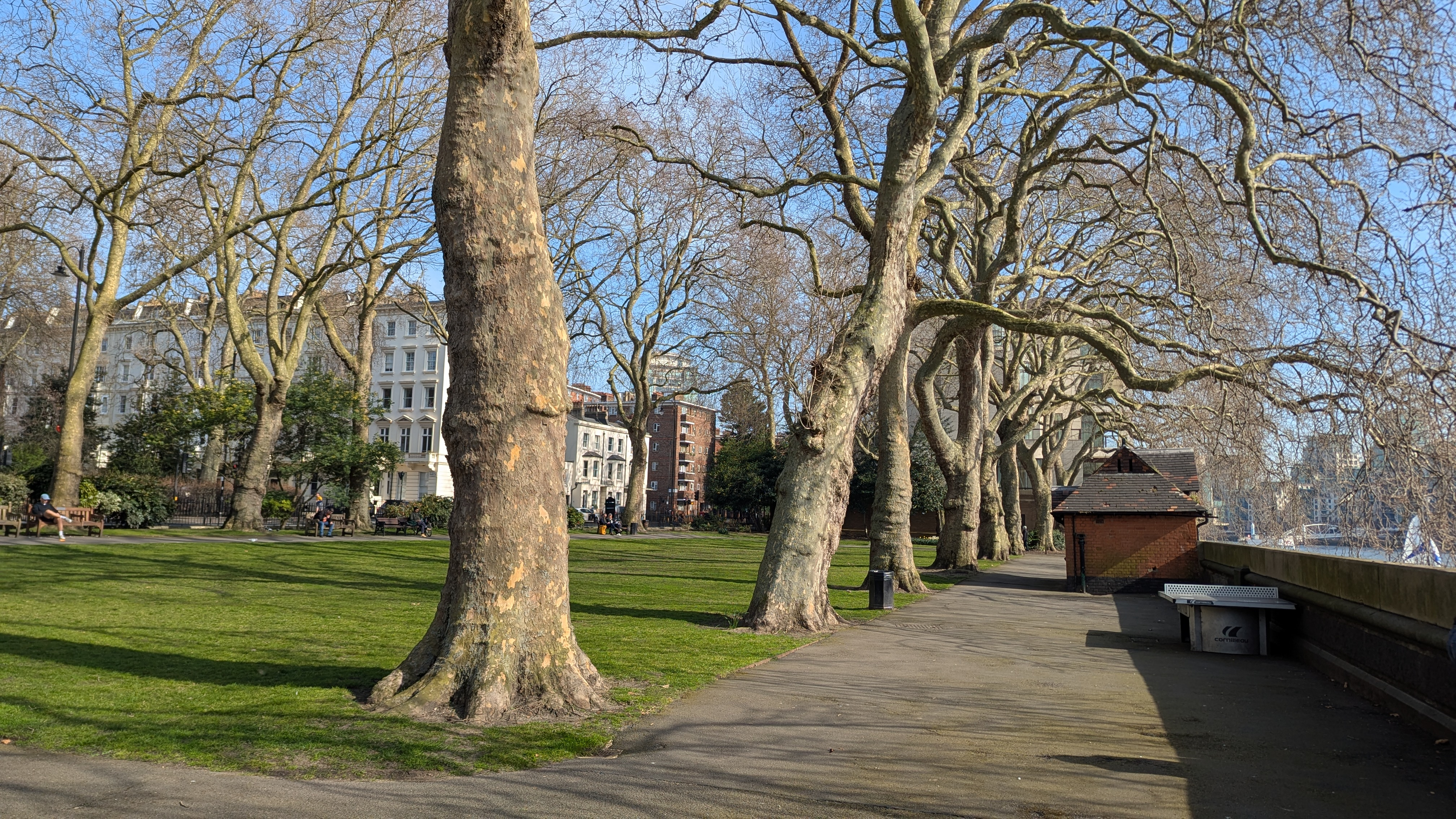
The gardens and the River Thames

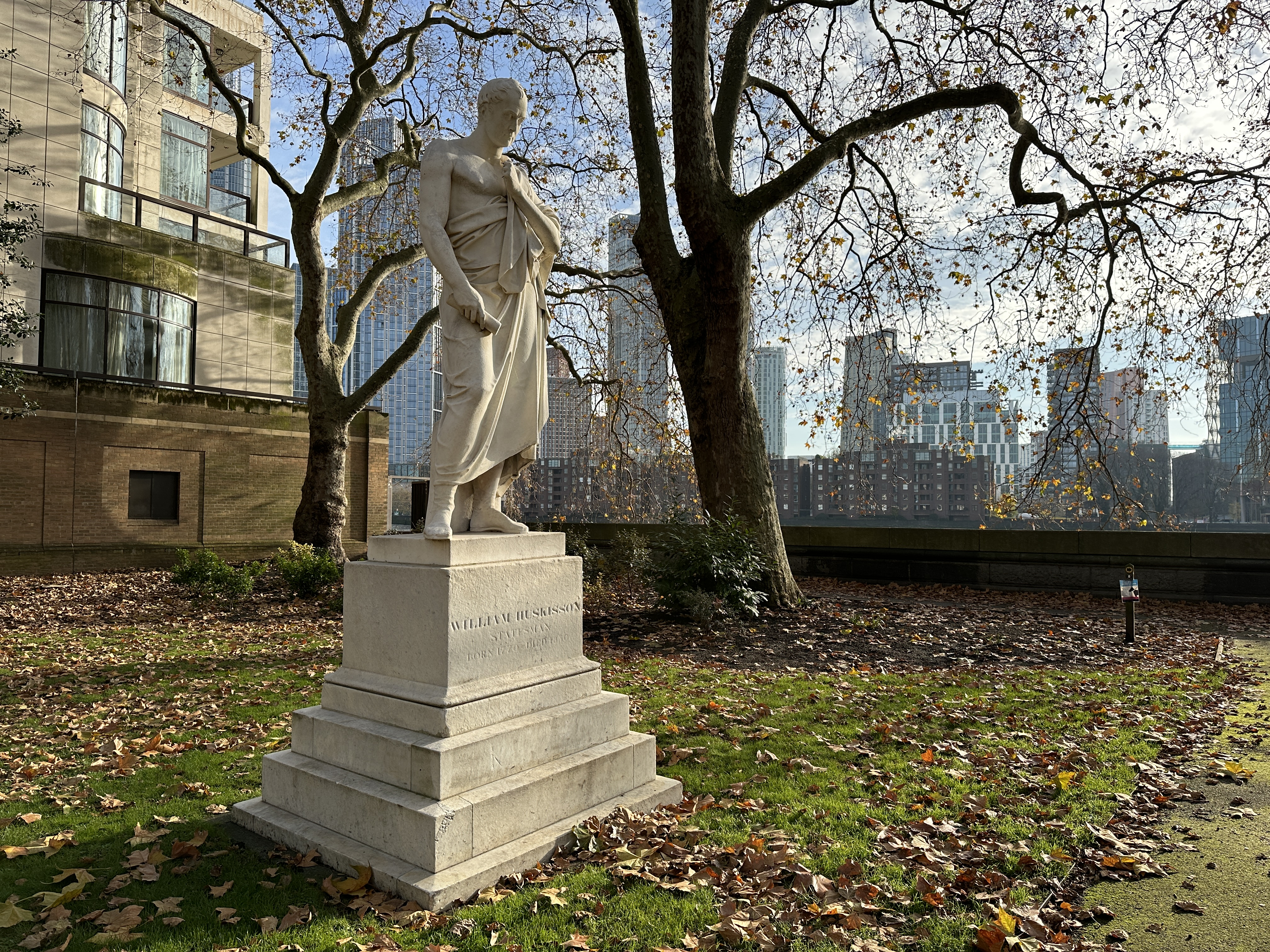
Statue of William Huskisson (1836) by John Gibson

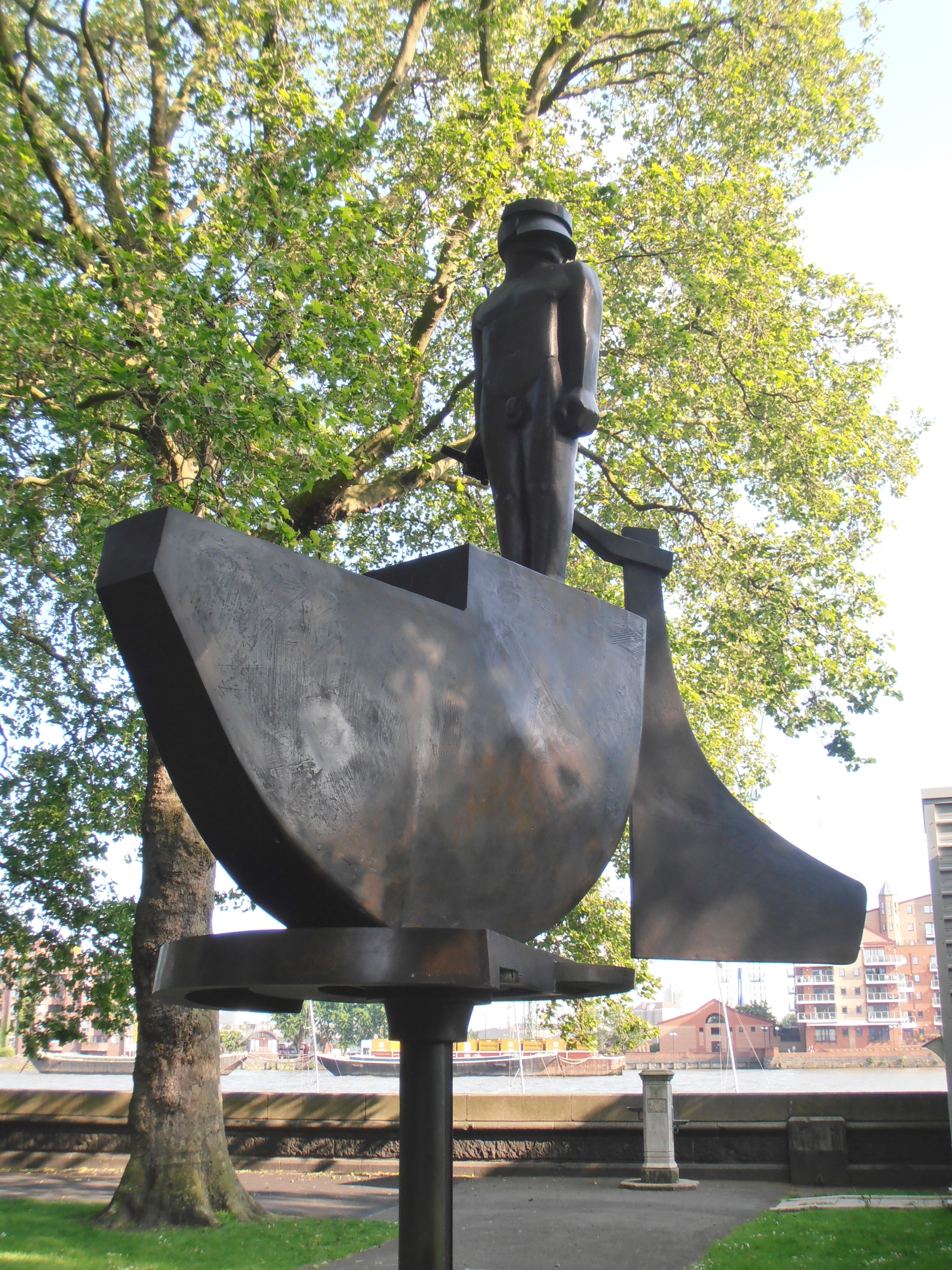
The Helmsman (1996) by André Wallace

== Sources ==
- Bradley, Simon; Pevsner, Nikolaus (2003). London 6: Westminster. The Buildings of England. New Haven, US and London: Yale University Press. ISBN 978-0-300-09595-1.
- Crone, Dorian A. T. A.; Chapple, Nick (2025). Pimlico Gardens Heritage Statement (PDF). London: Heritage Information Ltd.
