= Amelioration =

Amelioration may refer to:

- Amelioration patterns, a software design pattern
- Amelioration Act 1798, a statute in the Leeward Islands regarding the treatment of slaves
- Rapid climatic amelioration, in geology, a major change from glacial to interglacial stages, specifically regarding transitions in the oxygen isotope ratio cycle
- Land improvement, alternatively called amelioration
- The process by which the pejorative associations of a word are swept away; see Pejorative#Pejoration and melioration
