= John Gibson (sculptor) =

Welsh sculptor (1790–1866)

John Gibson RA
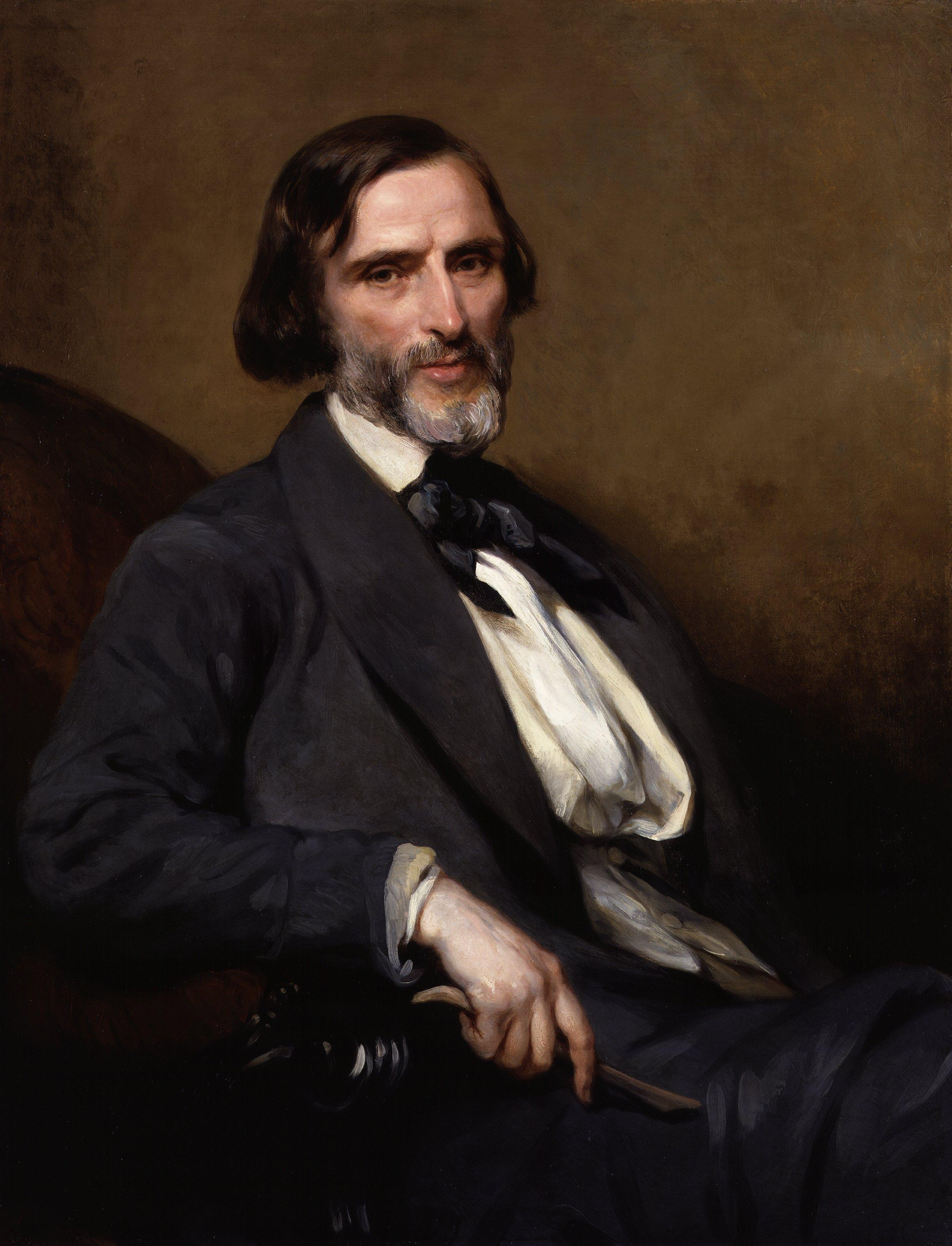
- Portrait of John Gibson by Margaret Sarah Carpenter, 1857
- Born: 19 June 1790; Conwy, Wales
- Died: 27 January 1866 (aged 75); Rome, Italy
- Known for: Sculpture
- Notable work: Queen Victoria Supported by Justice and Clemency (1855); Hunter and Dog (1838)

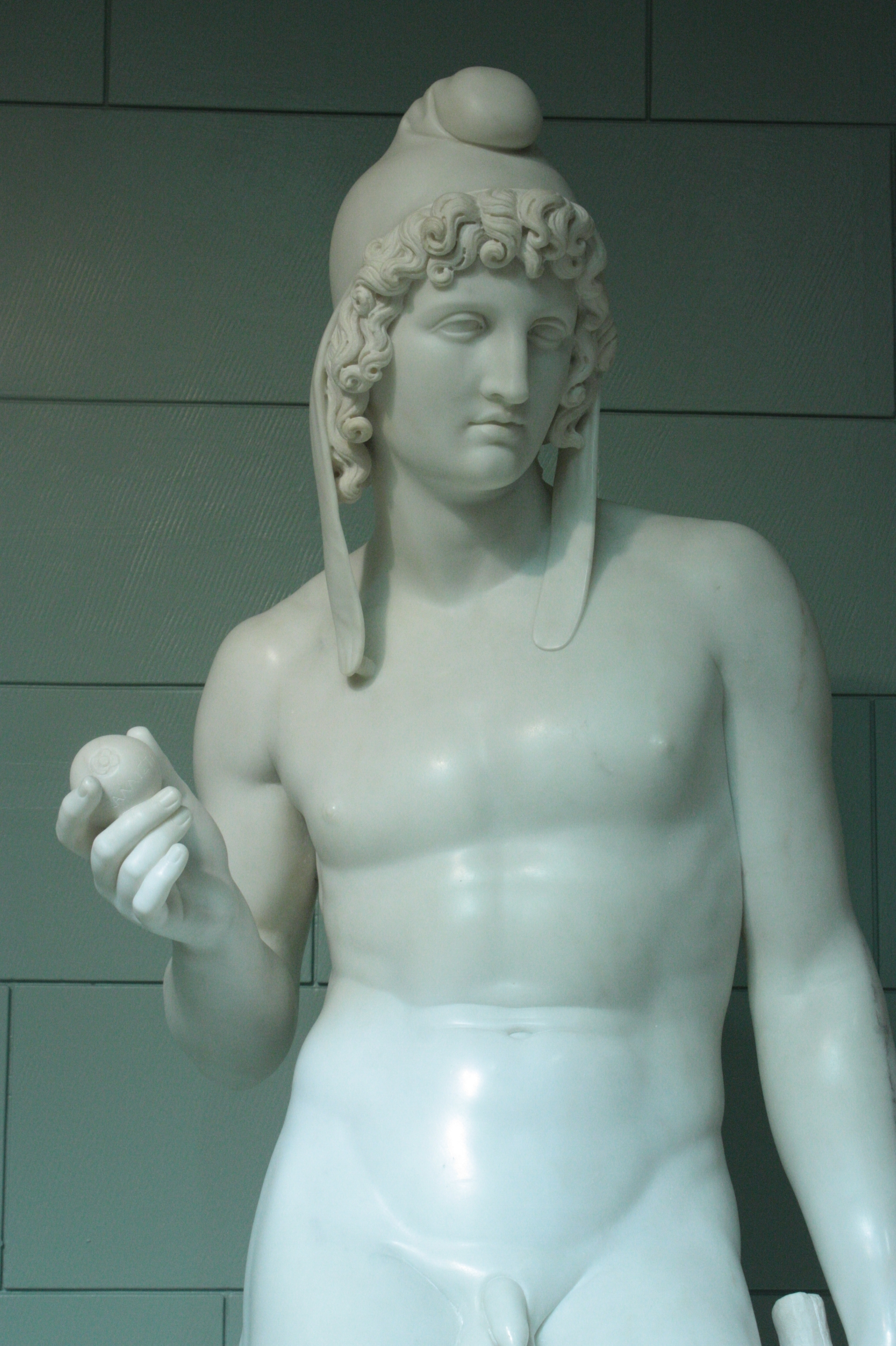
Paris (1824)

John Gibson RA (19 June 1790 – 27 January 1866) was a Welsh neoclassical sculptor who studied in Rome under Canova. He excelled chiefly in bas-relief, notably the two life-size works The Hours Leading the Horses of the Sun and Phaethon Driving the Chariot of the Sun, but was also proficient in monumental and portrait statuary. He is famous for his statues of Sir Robert Peel (Westminster Abbey), William Huskisson (St George's Square) and Queen Victoria (Houses of Parliament). Gibson was elected a Royal Academician in 1836, and left the contents of his studio to the Royal Academy, where many of his marbles and casts are currently on display.

== Life ==
=== Early life ===
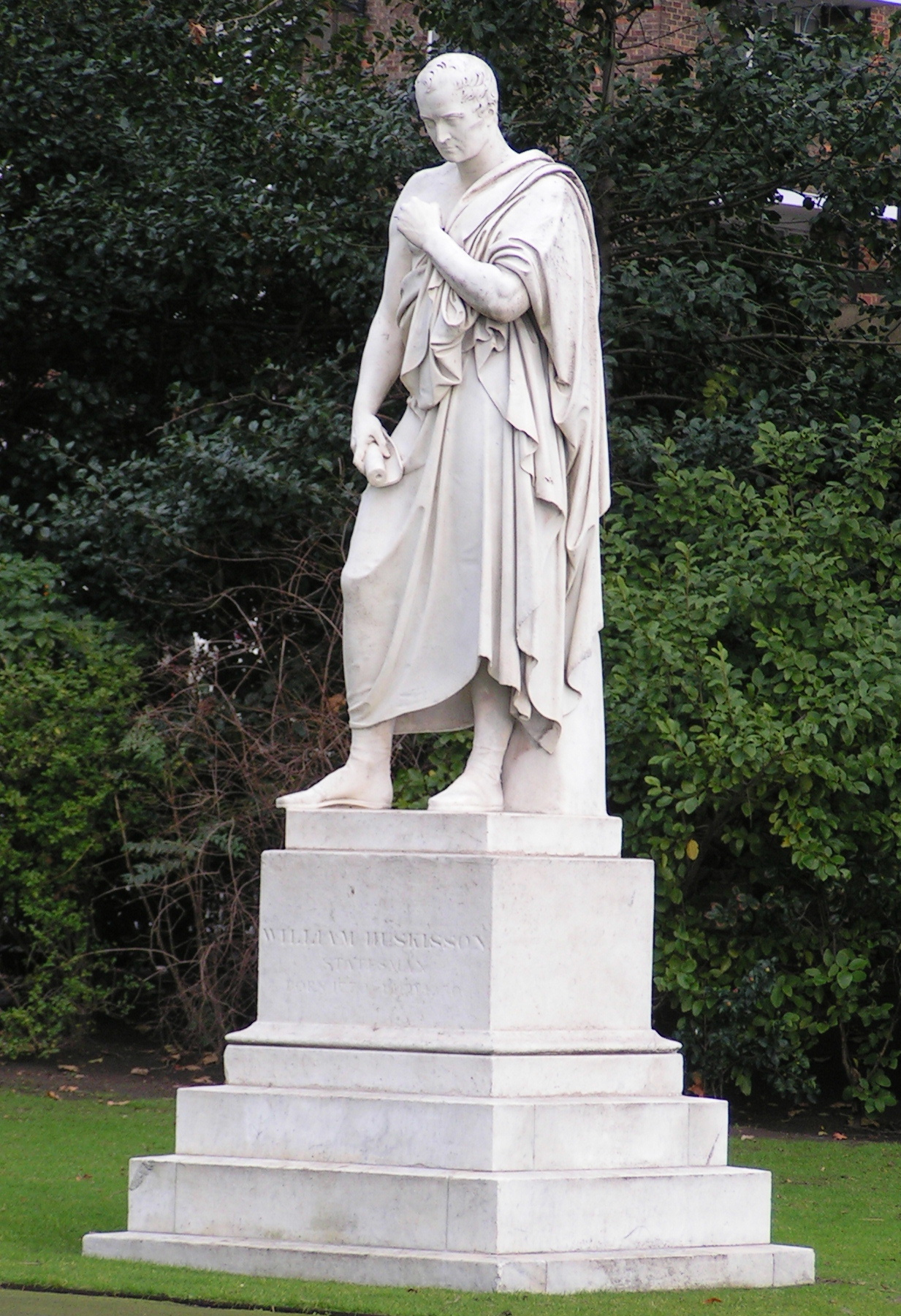
Detail of statue of William Huskisson by John Gibson in Pimlico Gardens, London.

Gibson was born near Conwy, Wales, where his father was a market gardener. When he was nine years old the family were on the point of emigrating to America, but his mother put a stop to this plan on their arrival at Liverpool, where they settled, and where Gibson was sent to school. He became fascinated by the displays in the windows of the city's print shops. The painter and printseller John Turmeau lent him some drawings and plaster casts to copy.

=== Education ===
At the age of fourteen, Gibson was apprenticed to a firm of cabinet-makers. He soon took a violent dislike to this work, however, and eventually managed to have his articles bought out by the monumental masons Samuel and Thomas Franceys. It was while apprenticed to the Franceys brothers that Gibson came to the attention of the historian William Roscoe, for whom he executed a terracotta bas-relief now in the Liverpool museum. Roscoe gave Gibson access to his library at Allerton, by which means he became acquainted with the designs of the great Italian masters.

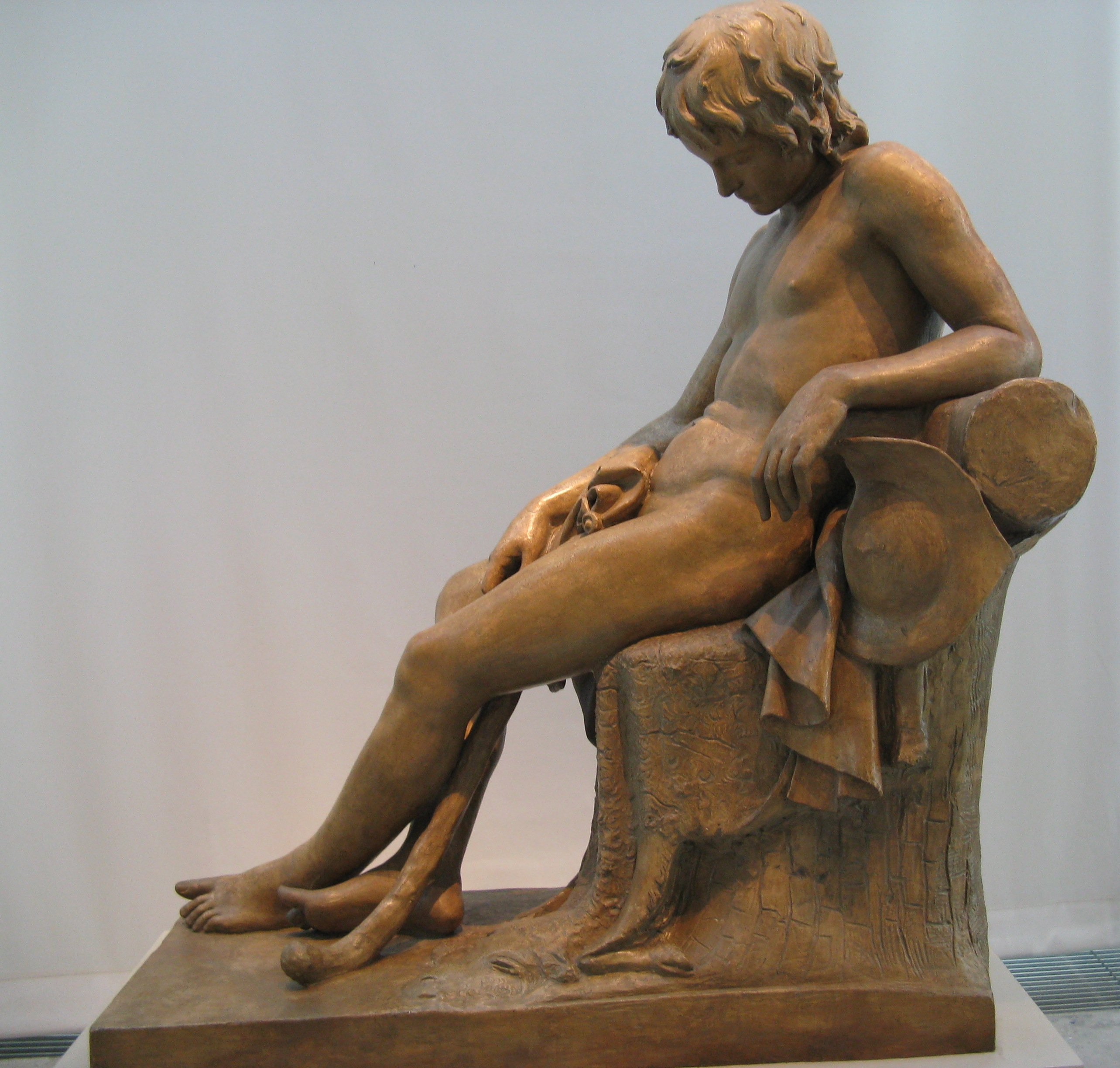
Sleeping Shepherd Boy (1824)

A cartoon (now also in the Liverpool museum) of The Fall of the Angels marked this period. He studied anatomy, his lessons provided gratis by a medical man, and gained introductions to families of refinement and culture in Liverpool. Roscoe was an excellent guide to his protégée, pointing to the Greeks as the only examples for a sculptor. Gibson here found his true vocation. A basso rilievo of Psyche Carried by the Zephyrs was the result. He sent it to the Royal Academy, where John Flaxman, recognizing its merits, gave it an excellent place. Again he became unsettled. He conceived a wish to further his artistic education in Rome, and the first step to this goal went to go to London; there he received conflicting advice from Flaxman and from Francis Legatt Chantrey, the former urging him go to Rome as the highest school of sculpture in the world, the latter maintaining that London could do as much for him.

=== Rome ===
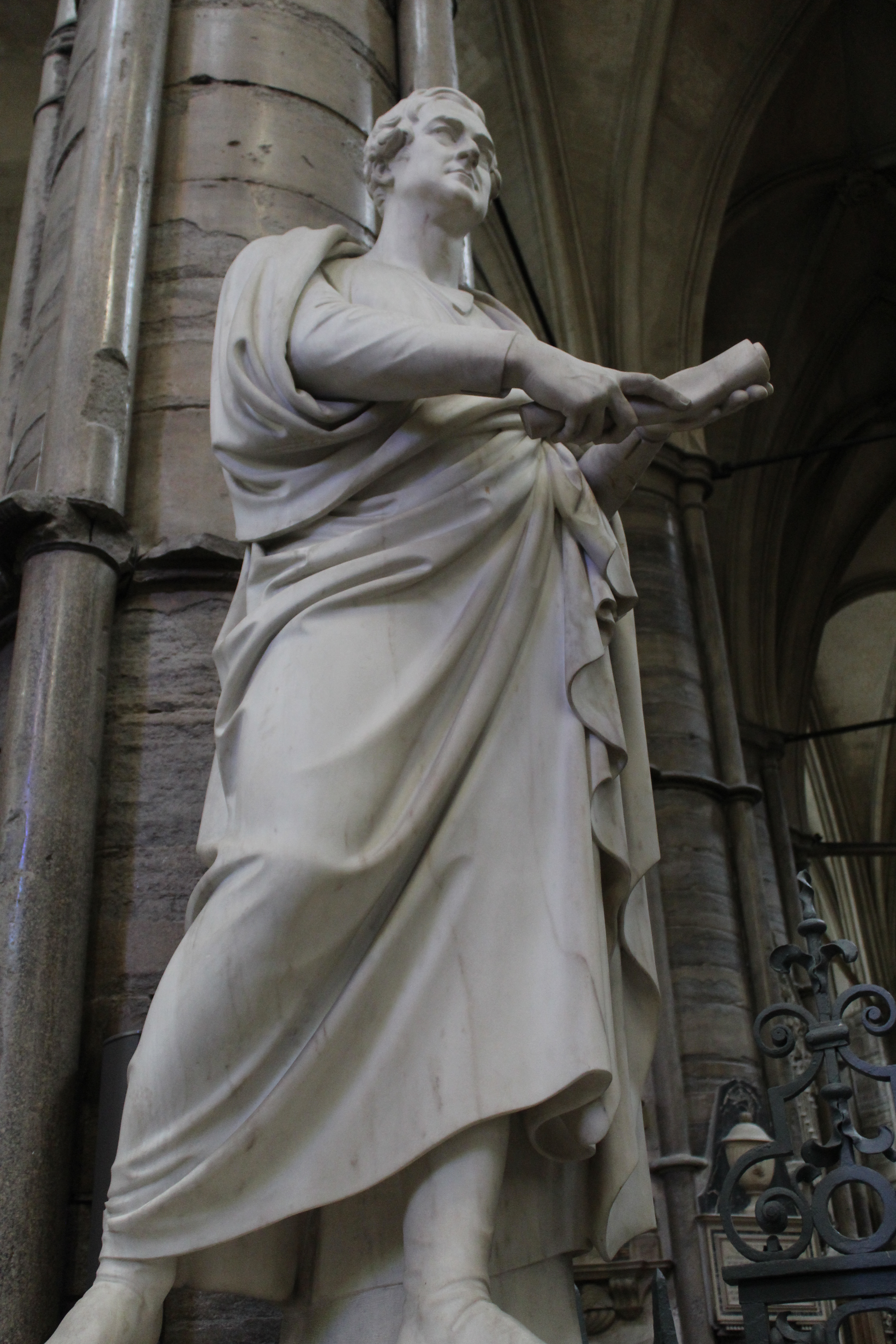
Gibson's statue of Robert Peel, Westminster Abbey

Gibson arrived in Rome in October 1817, at a comparatively late age for a first visit. There he was generously received by Antonio Canova, to whom he had introductions, the Venetian sculptor putting not only his experience in art but his purse at the English student's service. Up to this time, though his designs show a fire and power of imagination in which no teaching is missed, Gibson had had no instruction, and had studied at no academy. In Rome he first became acquainted with the rules and technicalities of art. Canova introduced him into the academy supported by Austria, and the first sense of his deficiencies in common matters of practice was depressing to him. He saw Italian youths already excelling in the drawing of the figure. But the tables were soon turned. His first work in marble, Sleeping Shepherd Boy, was completed in 1824.

Gibson was soon launched, and distinguished patrons, initially sent by Canova, made their way to his studio in the Via Fontanella. His aim was always purity of character and beauty of form. He rarely declined into the prettiness of Canova, and if he did not often approach the masculine strength of Bertel Thorvaldsen, he more than once surpassed him even in that quality. He was essentially classic in feeling and aim, but here his habit of observation enabled him to achieve a grace beyond the reach of a mere imitator. His subjects were gleaned from the free actions of the Italian people noticed on his walks, and afterwards given such mythological names as best fitted them. Thus a girl kissing a child over her shoulder became a Nymph and Cupid; a woman helping her child with his foot on her hand on to her lap, a Bacchante and Faun; his Amazon Thrown from Her Horse, one of his most original productions, was taken from an accident he witnessed to a female rider in a circus; and Hunter and Dog was also the result of a street scene.

== Personal life ==
Throughout most of his time in Rome Gibson had an alleged relationship with the Welsh artist Penry Williams, both of whom were also friends with Richard Buckner.

=== Death ===
Gibson was elected R.A. in 1836, and bequeathed all his property and the contents of his studio to the Royal Academy, where his marbles and casts are open to the public as of 2005. He died at Rome on 7 January 1866 and was buried in the Protestant Cemetery there.

== Reception ==
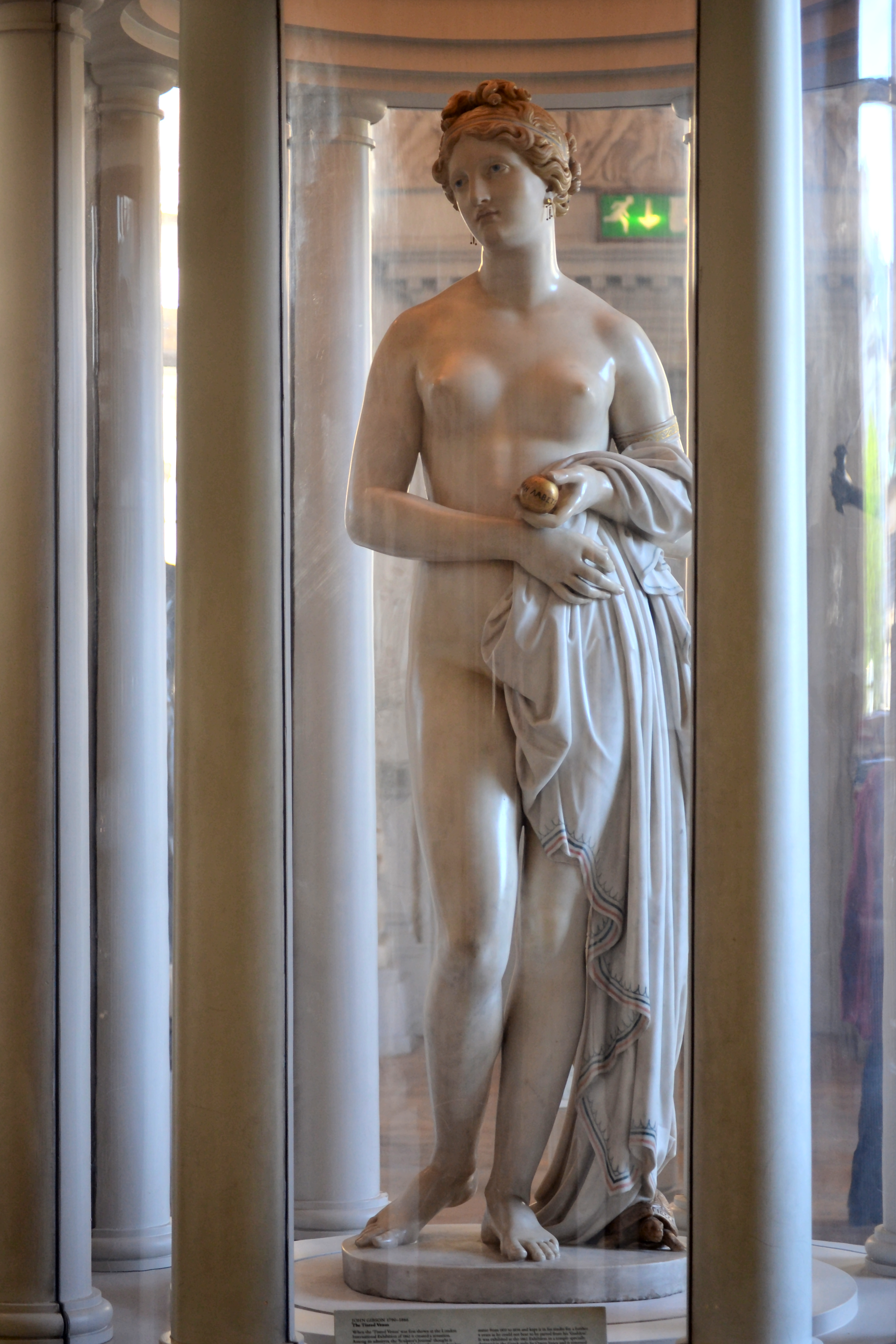
Tinted Venus, in the Walker Art Gallery, Liverpool

Gibson made a multiple monument and portrait statues for public places, including work in the group showing Queen Victoria Supported by Justice and Clemency, in the Houses of Parliament. Gibson also created a statue of William Huskisson with a bared arm and the seated figure of Dudley North.

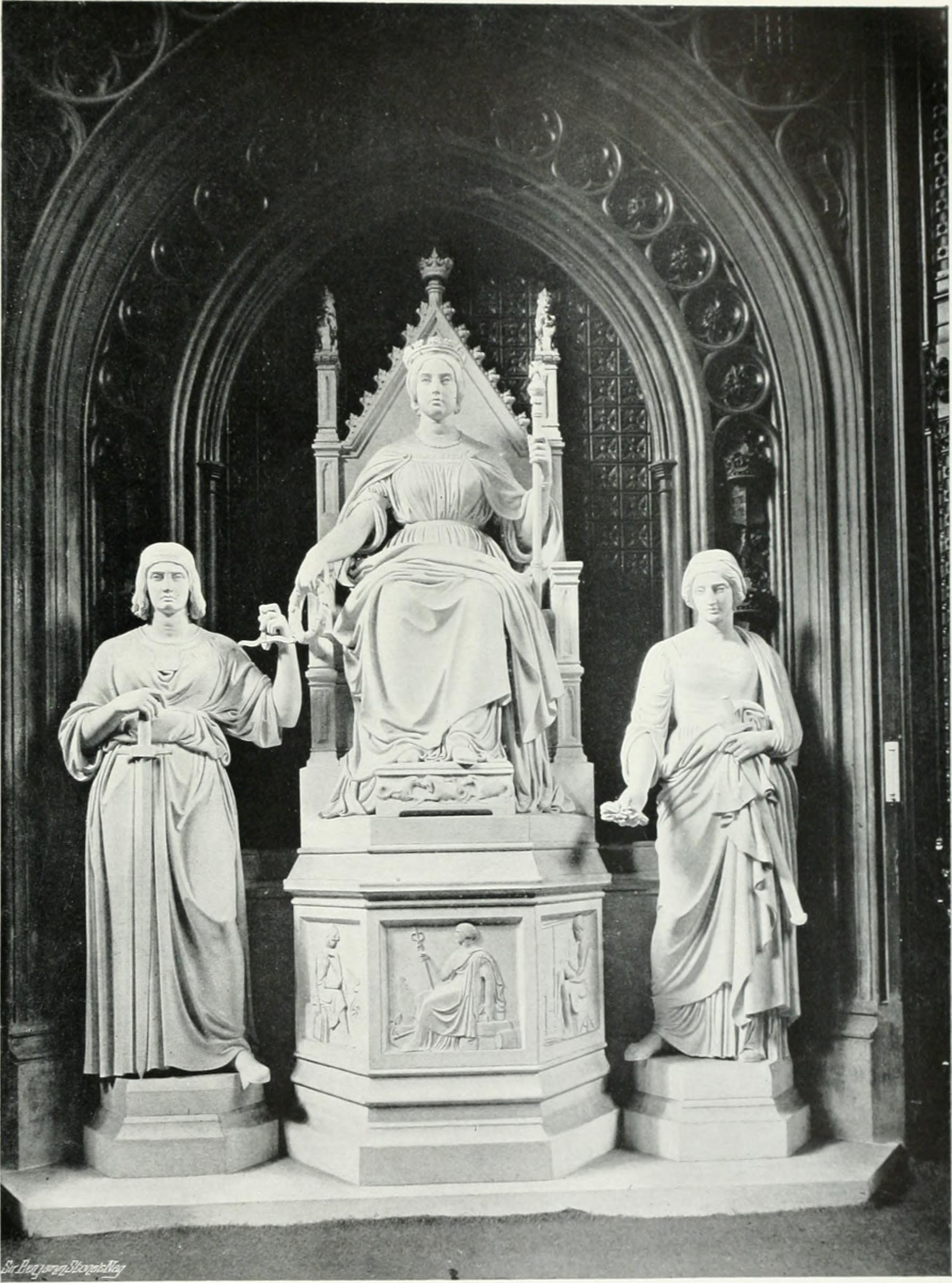
Her Majesty Queen Victoria, Supported by Justice and Clemency, in the Palace of Westminster

Gibson's chief excellence, however, lay in basso rilievo. His thorough knowledge of the horse, and his constant study of the Elgin Marbles, casts of which are in Rome, resulted in the two bassi rilievi, the size of life, which belonged to Lord Fitzwilliam: The Hours Leading the Horses of the Sun, and Phaethon Driving the Chariot of the Sun. Most of his memorial works are also in basso rilievo. Some of these are of a truly refined and pathetic character, such as the monument to the Countess of Leicester, wife of Thomas Coke, the 1st Earl, or that to his friend Mrs Huskisson in Chichester Cathedral, and that of the Bonomi children. Passion, either indulged or repressed, was the natural impulse of his art: repressed as in the Hours Leading the Horses of the Sun, and as in the Hunter and Dog; indulged as in the meeting of Hero and Leander, a drawing executed before he left England. Gibson was the first to introduce colour on his statues, first as a mere border to the drapery of a portrait statue of the queen, and by degrees extended to the entire flesh, as in his so-called Tinted Venus and in Love Tormenting the Soul, both now in the Walker Art Gallery in Liverpool.

In all worldly affairs and the business of daily life he was simple and guileless in the extreme; but was resolute in matters of principle. He was visited by William Dean Howells in Naples who described him as "dressed with extraordinary slovenliness and indifference to clothes, had no collar, I think, and evidently did not know what he had on. Everything about him bespoke the utmost unconsciousness and democratic plainness of life..."

== Biographies ==
The letters between Gibson and Margaret Sandbach, granddaughter of William Roscoe, and a sketch of his life that lady induced him to write, furnish the chief materials for his biography. See his Life, edited by Lady Eastlake.

- John Gibson R.A. The World of the Master Sculptors is the first biography of Gibson in over a century. The book incorporates many illustrations and highlights Canova, Thorvaldsen, Spencer and Wyatt. ISBN 978-1-906823-71-9.

== Published works ==
- Imitations of Drawings By Iohn Gibson R.A. Sculptor. Engraved By G. Wenzel And L. Prosseda Rome 1852 [London]: J. Hogarth 1852

Gibson provided almost all the illustrations for:

- Elizabeth Strutt The Story of Psyche: With a Classical Enquiry Into the Significance and Origin of the Fable; by Elizabeth Strutt with designs in outline By John Gibson Esq. R.A. [London: s.n. 1852].

Material by him is incorporated in:

- Joseph Bonomi The Proportions of the Human Figure, As Handed Down to Us by Vitruvius, from the Writings of the Famous Sculptors and Painters of Antiquity: To Be Which is Added, the Admirable Method of Measuring the Figure, Invented by John Gibson, Sculptor; With Description and Illustrative Outlines Third edition. London: Charles Robertson 1872; Gibson is not credited in the 1st and 2nd editions, London: Henry Renshaw 1856 [1855] and London: Chapman & Hall; H. G. Bohn 1857

== Sources ==
- Matthews, T. The Biography of John Gibson, R.A., Sculptor, Rome. 1911.
- Anna Frasca-Rath, John Gibson. Rezeption, Transfer, Inszenierung, Wien 2018. [Online Publikation; https://www.vandenhoeck-ruprecht-verlage.com/themen-entdecken/kunst-und-architektur/kunstgeschichte-kunstwissenschaft/38255/john-gibson-und-antonio-canova?c=1763]
- John Gibson's Workshop in Rome by Anna Frasca-Rath
- John Gibson, designer: sculpture and reproductive media in the nineteenth century by Roberto C. Ferrari.2015
