= List of public art in the City of Westminster =

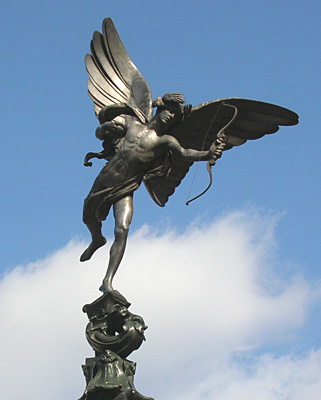
The Shaftesbury Memorial Fountain or "Eros" (1885–1893) by Alfred Gilbert, Piccadilly Circus

There are more than 400 public artworks in the City of Westminster, a borough with city status in Central London. The borough has more public sculpture than any other area of London. This reflects its central location containing much of the West End, the political centres of Westminster and Whitehall and three of the Royal Parks (Green Park, Hyde Park and St James's Park, with parts also of Regent's Park and Kensington Gardens). Many of the most notable sites for commemoration in London are to be found in the City of Westminster, including Trafalgar Square, Parliament Square and the Victoria Embankment. Other monuments of note in the borough include the Albert Memorial and the Victoria Memorial. After World War I many memorials to that conflict were raised in the area, the most significant being the Cenotaph in Whitehall. So great is the number of monuments in the borough that Westminster City Council has deemed an area stretching from Whitehall to St James's to be a "monument saturation zone", where the addition of new memorials is generally discouraged. The same restriction applies in Royal Parks within the borough.

== Lists of public art by district ==
- Belgravia
- Covent Garden
- Green Park
- Hyde Park (including Hyde Park Corner and Marble Arch)
- Kensington
- Kensington Gardens
- Knightsbridge
- Mayfair
- Millbank
- Paddington (including Bayswater and Maida Vale)
- Pimlico
- St James's
- St Marylebone (including Fitzrovia, Lisson Grove, Marylebone, Regent's Park and St John's Wood)
- Soho
- Strand
- Trafalgar Square
- Victoria
- Victoria Embankment
- Westminster
- Whitehall

== Temporary artworks ==
The City of Westminster hosts several temporary displays of sculpture. The most prominent of these is at the Fourth plinth in Trafalgar Square, which has shown works by contemporary artists on rotation since 1999. Temporary outdoor displays of sculpture can also be seen at the Royal Academy and the Chelsea College of Arts.

In 2010 Westminster City Council launched the City of Sculpture festival, which has seen contemporary sculpture installed in locations across the borough. Initially intended for the run-up to the 2012 Olympic Games in London, the project's duration has been extended beyond that point. The showcased works are exhibited at the galleries' and the sculptors' expense. The scheme has been criticised for its perceived commercialism and its sculptures have been described as "plop art".
