= Statue of William Huskisson =

Statue in London, England

Coordinates: 51.4857°N 0.1334°W

William Huskisson
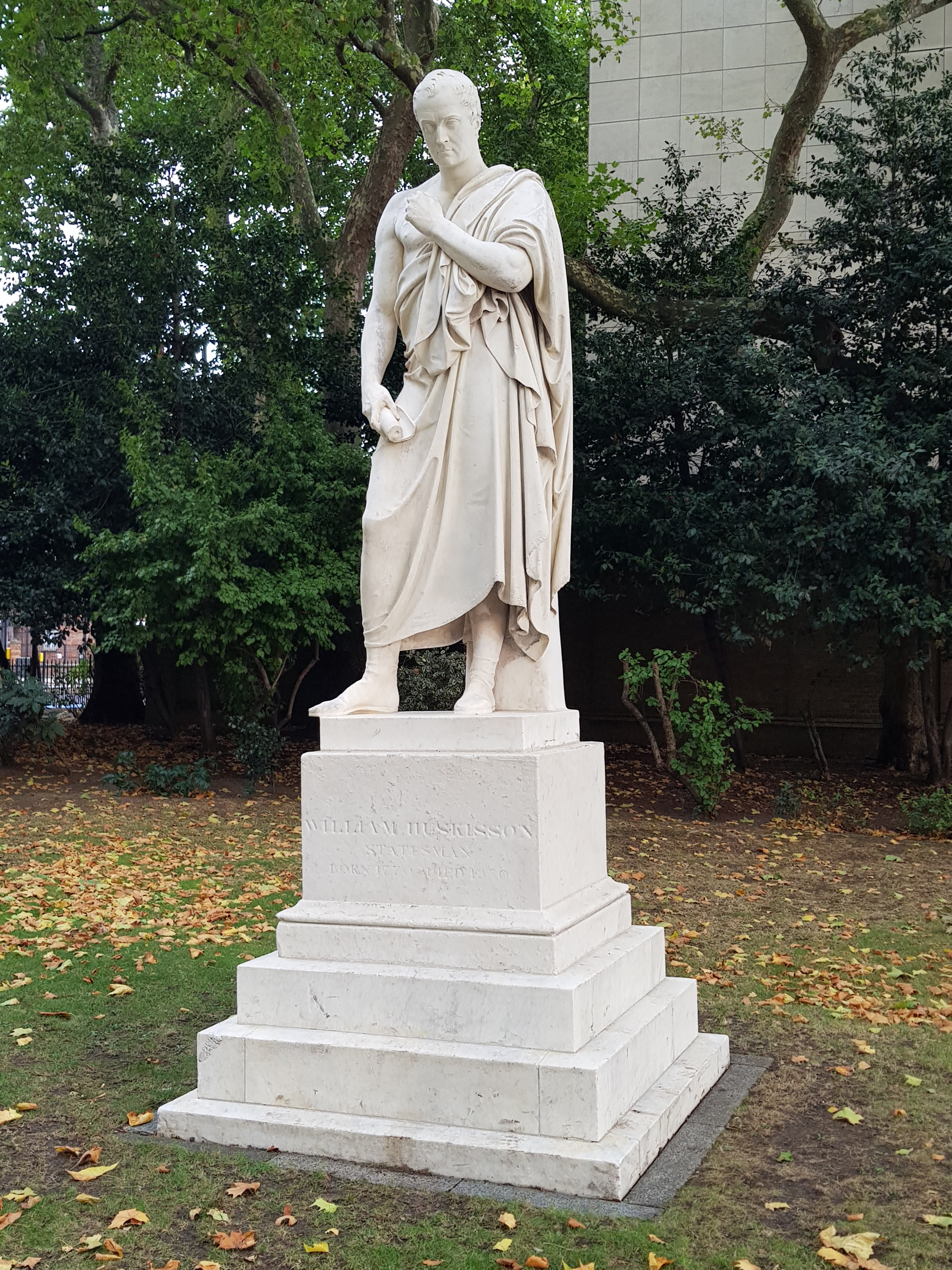
- Artist: John Gibson
- Completion date: 1848
- Subject: William Huskisson
- Location: London

Listed Building – Grade II
- Official name: Statue of William Huskisson in Pimlico Gardens
- Designated: 4 January 2016
- Reference no.: 1431794

The statue of William Huskisson is a marble statue in Pimlico Gardens, a small park in the Pimlico area of London. It was listed Grade II on the National Heritage List for England in January 2016.

William Huskisson served as a Member of Parliament for Liverpool, but is more widely remembered as being the first fatal victim of a railway accident at the opening of the Liverpool and Manchester Railway in 1830 which he had been involved in creating. There are however sources which suggest there had been victims of railway crashes before him. It was his involvement in railways and the support of industry in Liverpool which would make him popular among his constituents.

His death was considered a tragedy and a committee was formed with the aim of creating a memorial for Huskisson. The statue was designed by John Gibson, who, a practitioner of more classical styles of sculpture, depicted Huskisson in the Roman senatorial wear of a toga. While this decision has been questioned, it was one which Huskisson's widow would appreciate.

The statue in Pimlico Gardens was the second commissioned, with the original made for Huskisson's mausoleum in Liverpool. This copy was intended to be placed in Liverpool's Custom House but was given to Lloyd's of London unveiled in 1848 and stood in their offices in the Royal Exchange. In 1915 its ownership was then given to the London County Council and it was then installed in its current location.

Historic marble sculptures are exposed to weathering and continuous environmental pollution over the years, leading to the accumulation of harmful layers of dirt and crusts on their surfaces. Consequently, a team of scientists and sculpture conservators conducted a detailed study on the nature of these crusts on the marble statue of William Huskisson, aiming to understand its chemical composition and determine the optimal ways for its restoration and protection.

== See also ==
- Pimlico Gardens
- List of public art in the City of Westminster
