= Consolidated Slave Law =

The Consolidated Slave Law was a law which was enacted by the Barbados legislature in 1826. Following Bussa's Rebellion, London officials were concerned about further risk of revolts and instituted a policy of amelioration. This was resisted by white Barbadian planters. In consequence, the Consolidated Slave Act was a compromise: it simultaneously granted concessions to the slaves whilst also providing reassurances to the slave owners.

Three concessions to the slaves were:

- The right to own property
- The right to give evidence in courts in all cases
- A reduction in manumission fees

Three concessions granted to the slave owners were:

- That a white person could kill a slave during a revolt with impunity
- The capital punishment of any slave who threatened the life of a white person
- That all free black people needed a correct evidence of the such rights or they will be presumed to be enslaved

== See also ==
- Amelioration Act 1798
- William Huskisson
