= John Holden (artist) =

English painter

John Holden (born 1942) studied at Medway College of Art & Design (1959–63) and the Royal Academy Schools London (1963–66). His work is held in public and private collections worldwide.

He was Head of Fine Art at John Moores University until his retirement in July 2000. (award a sabbatical from John Moores University in 1998).

Solo shows include ‘ The Liverpool Years’ Dean Clough Gallery, Halifax (1996), Liverpool University Senate House (1997), Bury Art Gallery (1997). John Holden: Squaring the Void Agnews Gallery, Mayfair 02 March 2011 - 25 March 2011

Group exhibitions include John Moores, Walker Art Gallery, Liverpool (1995), Hunting Prizes, London (1996, 98, 99, 2001, 03, 04), Jerwood Drawing Open & Tour 2004/5.

Recent shows: with Paul Mason (sculptor) at Fermyn Woods Contemporary Art (2004), the Redbrick Mill, Batley (2004), Discerning Eye, invited 2005; Royal West of England Academy Open Painting (2005); Chichester Painting Open (2005).

== See also ==
- The London Group
- Abstract Art
