= Dukes Terrace =

Building in Liverpool, Merseyside, UK

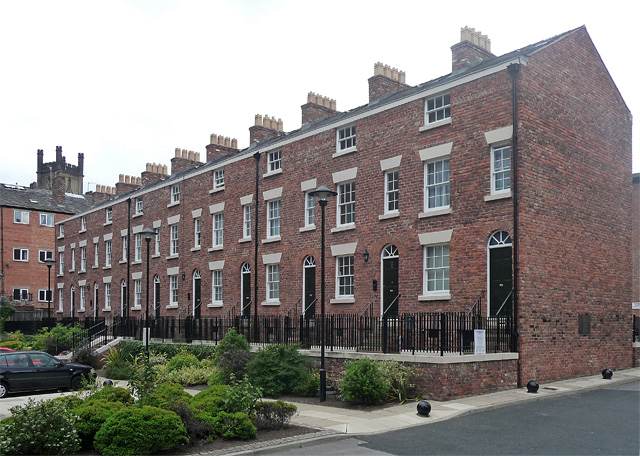
- The terrace frontage in 2011
- Interactive map of the Dukes Terrace area

General information
- Architectural style: Georgian
- Location: Liverpool, Merseyside, England, Dukes Terrace
- Coordinates: 53.4007°N 2.9770°W
- Completed: 1843; 183 years ago

Technical details
- Floor count: 3 (plus a cellar)

Dukes Terrace is an historic terraced house in the English city of Liverpool, Merseyside. A Grade II listed building, the terrace, which includes nine homes, was built in 1843, and is the last of the back-to-back building style in Liverpool. Originally the home of the employees of wealthy merchants, the property was condemned in the 1930s but avoided demolition because the tenants did not want to leave the community. It had fallen into dereliction by the 1970s and lay vacant for over thirty years. The building was restored and converted into apartments and housing in 2003.

The terrace is part of the Duke Street Conservation Area in the Georgian Quarter of the city centre that was built to service the "Old Dock" of 1715.

A statue of William Huskisson (1770–1830) stands in the car park in front of the terrace. Huskisson reportedly became the first railway passenger casualty when he was run over and fatally wounded by Robert Stephenson's pioneering locomotive Rocket.

== Gallery ==
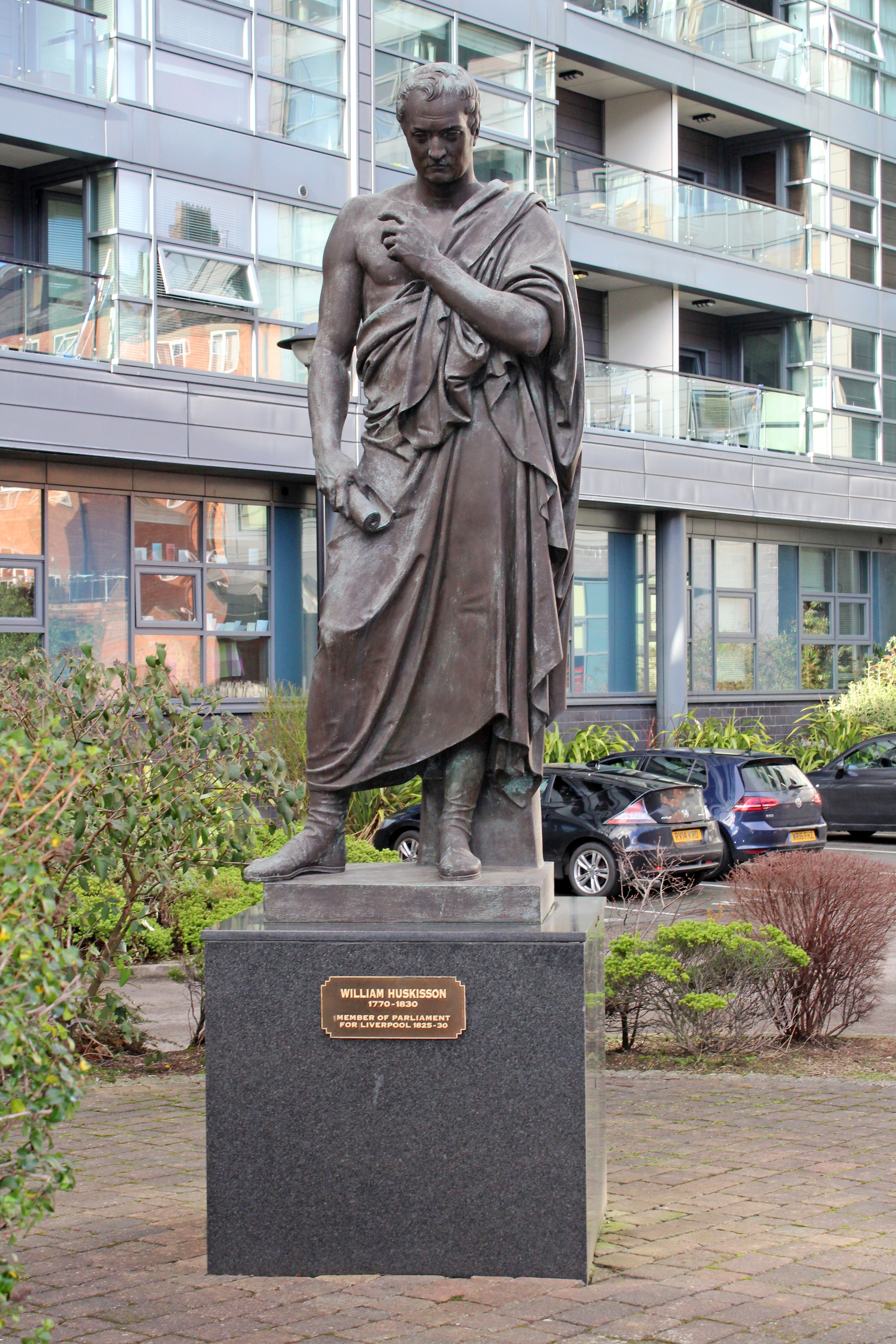
Statue of William Huskisson
