= Paul Mason (sculptor) =

British sculptor and artist (1952–2006)

- Born: Paul William Mason; 23 June 1952; Bolton, Lancashire
- Died: 9 May 2006 (Aged 53); London
- Known for: Sculptor
- Spouse(s): 1st Susan Disley, 2nd Emma Talbot
- Awards: Winner of the Royal Academy Gold Medal in 1976
- Website: www.paul-mason.com

Paul Mason (23 June 1952 – 9 May 2006) was a British sculptor and artist working mainly in stone and marble. Winner of the Royal Academy Gold Medal in 1976, his work has been exhibited in the United Kingdom and Europe, including the Tate Gallery, St Ives and the Bauhaus Kunst-Archiv in Berlin.

== Personal life and education ==
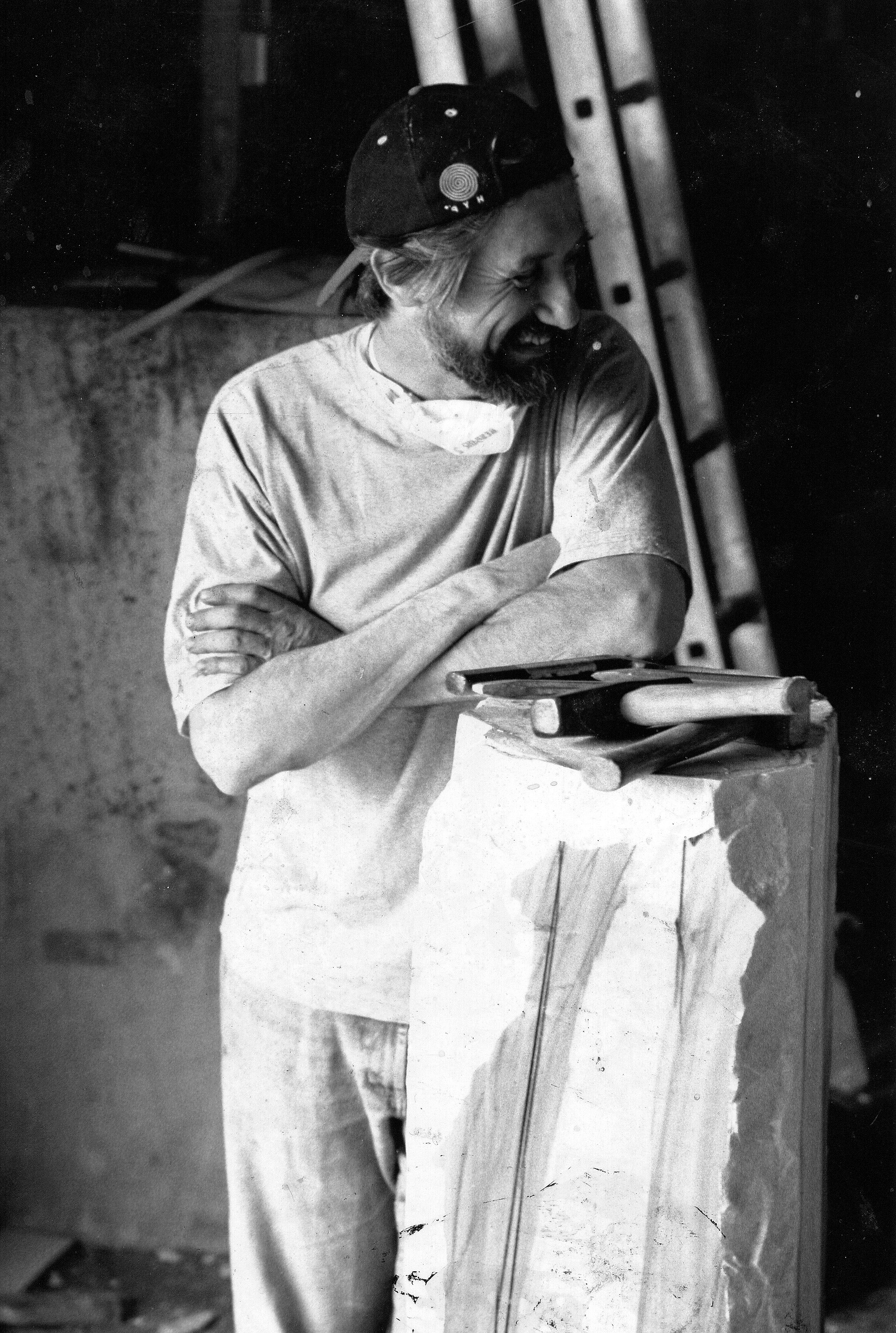
Paul Mason in residence at Barbara Hepworth's Studio St Ives 1996

Paul William Mason was born on 23 June 1952 in Bolton, Lancashire. Mason first married Susan Disley, a ceramicist, with whom he had a son, Joseph. He later married a painter, Emma Talbot, together they had sons Zachary and Daniel. Mason died from non-Hodgkin lymphoma. As of 2006, Emma was the Head of Painting and Two-Dimensional (2D) at St Martin's College, University of the Arts, London.

Mason studied first at Bolton College of Art & Design from 1970 to 71. Next he studied at Wolverhampton Polytechnic from 1971 to 74, under John Paddison, and finally at the Royal Academy from 1974 to 77, under Willi Soukop.

== Career ==
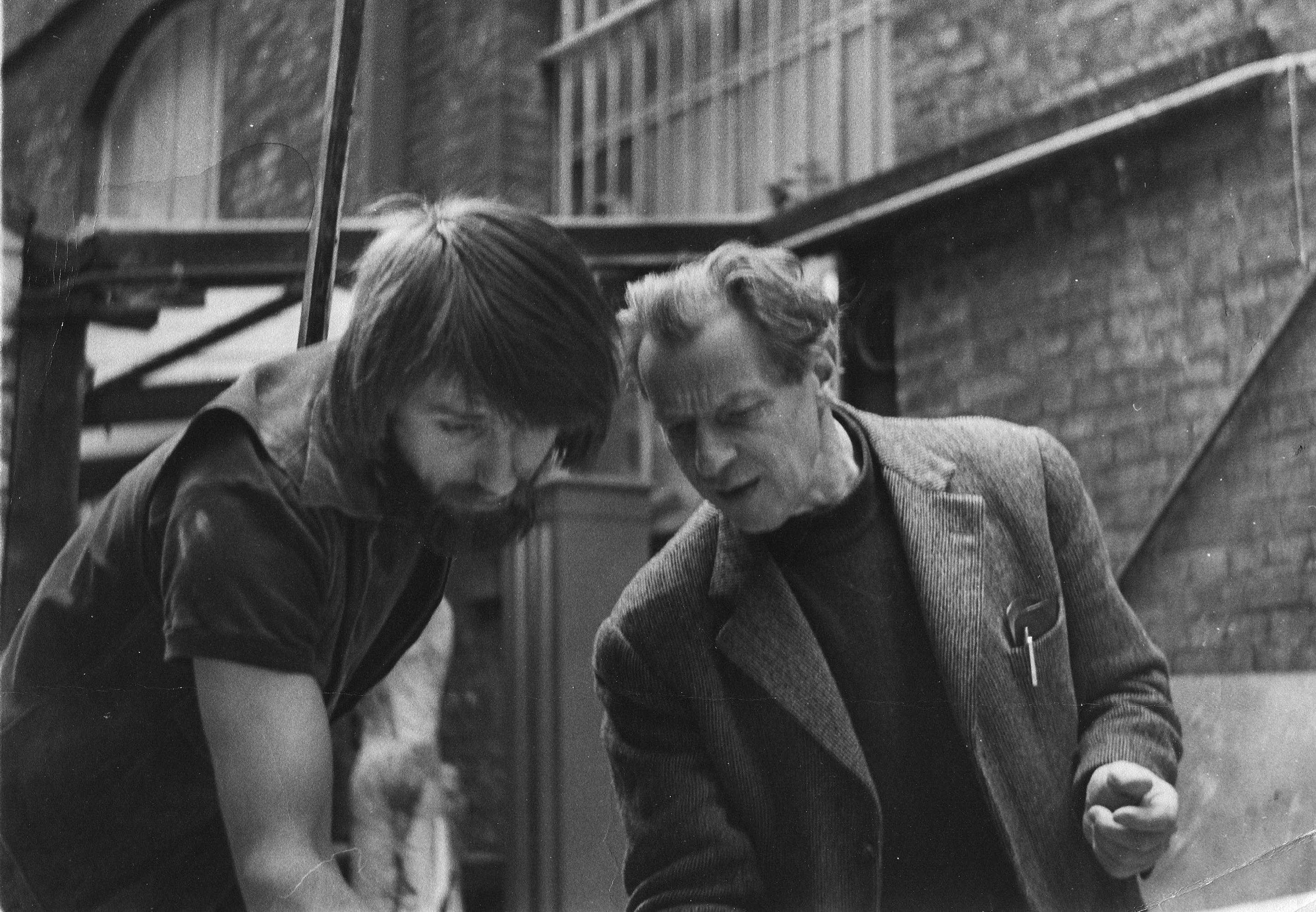
Paul Mason with Willi Soukop at the Royal Academy of Arts Schools, London

He is known for his exterior sculptures, dubbed "iconic stone carved pieces that are large scale interpretations of natural form", but he also painted, drew, created collages and made smaller sculptures.

Of his works, Mason said:

My works attempt to recognise and emulate the natural forces inherent in both carving and the geology. There is something deeply attractive and satisfying about the sculptural processes on both scales, and the dialogue between them that occurs quite naturally within the fragment and the whole.

He taught from 1993–1997 at Northumbria University. Mason taught at Derby University after Northumbria. In 2004, at Derby University, he became Professor of Sculpture. Mason also taught at art schools in Loughborough and Staffordshire.

Mason had in-house residencies in his career, including one at Gloucester Cathedral in 2000–01 and the other in 1996 at Tate St. Ives, where he worked in Barbara Hepworth’s Studio.

== Works ==
This is a partial list of Mason's works.

Work	Year	Location	Type	Notes and References
Hinge	1977	Harlow New Town, Harlow, Essex	Sculpture, red sandstone	The 5-foot outdoor sculpture, commissioned by Sir Frederick Gibberd, is positioned near post-war sculptures. It is at the Gibberd Garden.
Vertex	1979	Harlow, Essex	Sculpture, dove grey Bardolino marble from Carrara	The work, located on the Broad Walk, is 76 × 76 × 213 cm. Visit Harlow said it was his first major commission.
Centenary Square	1985	Sheffield		
Courtyard	1985	Harlow, Essex	Sculpture, marble	Mason created the work, which is 21 × 26.5 × 2.5 cm, for the Harlow District Council to commemorate Alan Medd's service to the city as Treasurer and Town Clerk. It is at Gibberd Gallery in the Civic Centre.
Leaf Field	1987	Museum of St Albans, St Albans	Sculpture, Lincolnshire limestone	The 1/2 ton sculpture, originally made for the Alban Arena, is located outside the Museum of St Albans.
Above & Below	1993	Southampton	Ancaster Limestone	The work is located at the National Maritime Building.
North Sta	1994	Edinburgh	Sculpture, marble and related artworks.	Edinburgh City Council commissioned the work.
Seaham Promenade sculptures and panels	1998	Durham	Sculpture and mosaic panels	He was lead artist for the Groundwork Trust East Company commission.
Gloucester Cathedral	2000–2001	Gloucester	Carvings	Residency for one year to produce carvings for the cathedral.
East Yar River Project	2002	Isle of Wight	Sculptures, Portland stone	Six sculptures are positioned from Niton to Brading. Island 2000 Trust commissioned the work.

== Exhibitions ==
The following are partial lists of Mason's exhibitions.

=== Solo exhibitions ===
2005 Stone Landscapes. Quay Arts. Newport Isle of Wight.
2001 "Division as Structure" Reliefs & Drawings Bauhaus Archiv, Berlin.
1998 Six Chapel Row, Bath.
1997 "From the Ocean Floor" Djanogly Arts Centre, Nottingham.
1996 Tate Gallery St Ives. Installation and new work sited throughout the permanent collection.

=== Group exhibitions ===
2004 Fermynwoods Gallery, Northampton with John Holden
1999 Dock Museum, Barrow in Furness.
1997 Drawing Exhibition, Newlyn Art Gallery.
1995 "Divers Memories" Pitt Rivers Museum, Oxford.

=== Retrospective exhibitions ===
2012 Tarpey Gallerys
