= John Turmeau =

English painter and miniaturist

John Turmeau (1776-1846) was an English painter who worked largely in portraiture, generally in the form of paper and ivory miniatures or large watercolours.

== Biography ==
Turmeau was born in Liverpool where he was based for most of his career. Turmeau studied at the Frampton's School in Putney and first had two miniatures exhibited in the Royal Academy in London at age seventeen, he stayed and worked at Villiers Street then Sackville Street during his time in London before moving back to Liverpool in 1799. He later served as president of the Liverpool Academy from 1812 to 1814 after contributing to its foundation and exhibited there until 1842. Turmeau would also assist sculptor John Gibson in his work, whom he accompanied in a visit to Italy, by lending him drawings and plaster-casts for copying. Turmeau also worked as an architect.
