= Amelioration Act 1798 =

Statute enacted in the Leeward Islands regarding the treatment of slaves

The Amelioration Act 1798 (sometimes referred to as the Melioration Act or the Slavery Amelioration Act) was a statute passed by the Leeward Islands to improve the conditions of slaves in the British Caribbean colonies.

It introduced financial compensation for slaves, and therefore penalties for owners, for instances of cruelty or serious neglect. The act prohibited marriages between slaves according to Christian religious ceremony.

The act was effectively repealed by the Slave Trade Act 1807, which made it illegal to trade in slaves to or from any British territory. The act applied in all of the British Leeward Island colonies in the Caribbean until its implied repeal by the Slavery Abolition Act 1833. The act is most often noted for its provisions for financial penalties for inflicting cruel and unusual punishments on slaves. It also made provisions for basic entitlements of slaves to clothes, food and rudimentary education. However, the act was somewhat eclectic in effect; it also prohibited marriages between slaves being sanctified by religious ceremony.

The act is sometimes portrayed as an example of extending basic human rights to slaves. Whilst that may be correct, it is also probable that the act had considerably less altruistic purposes. Agitation amongst slaves was increasing in the region at the time, and slave rebellions were becoming increasingly frequent. Trying to moderate the conduct of the worst slave owners was partly a measure to control these outbreaks of violence. It suggested that the Act served an economic function; anticipating the abolition of the slave trade (which in fact subsequently happened pursuant to the Slave Trade Act 1807). It has been argued that the act sought to preserve the well-being and encourage the breeding of existing slave populations to preserve the labour basis upon which the Caribbean's plantation economies were based.

It does not appear that the provisions which prohibited cruel and unusual punishments were widely enforced. However, in at least one notable instance, the trial of Arthur Hodge for the murder of one of his slaves, the act was cited obliquely. Hodge's counsel, at the bail hearing, had argued that "A Negro being property, it was no greater offense for his master to kill him than it would be to kill his dog," a submission that was ridiculed by the prosecution, but, being unable to cite authority to refute it, made reference to the act and averred that it was completely inconsistent with being entitled to kill slaves.

Use of the term "cruel and unusual punishments", derived from the English Bill of Rights might have also been influenced by its inclusion in the Eighth Amendment to the United States Constitution some ten years previously, whose text was well known to English-speaking jurists.

== See also ==
- Slavery in the British and French Caribbean
- Consolidated Slave Law
