= André Wallace =

André Wallace FRSA (born 1947) is an English sculptor. He has created many public sculptures on commission, which stand in locations in Britain.

== Life ==
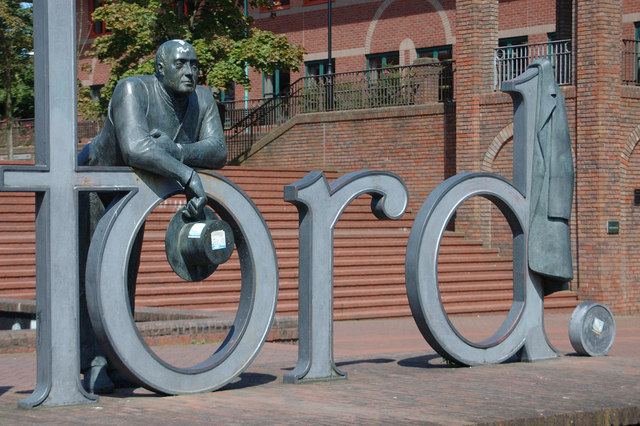
Statue of Thomas Telford in Telford, Shropshire

Wallace was born in Somerset, and studied at the Somerset College of Art from 1964 to 1967; he went on to study at the Liverpool College of Art from 1967 to 1970, the Royal Academy Schools from 1970 to 1971 and the Royal College of Art from 1971 to 1973. He gained in 1974 the Sainsbury Prize for sculpture.

His works have been shown at the Royal Academy since 1973, and at other exhibitions in the UK and abroad. He has produced works for public spaces and smaller sculptures for interiors. He is a Fellow of the Royal Society of Sculptors.

== Works ==
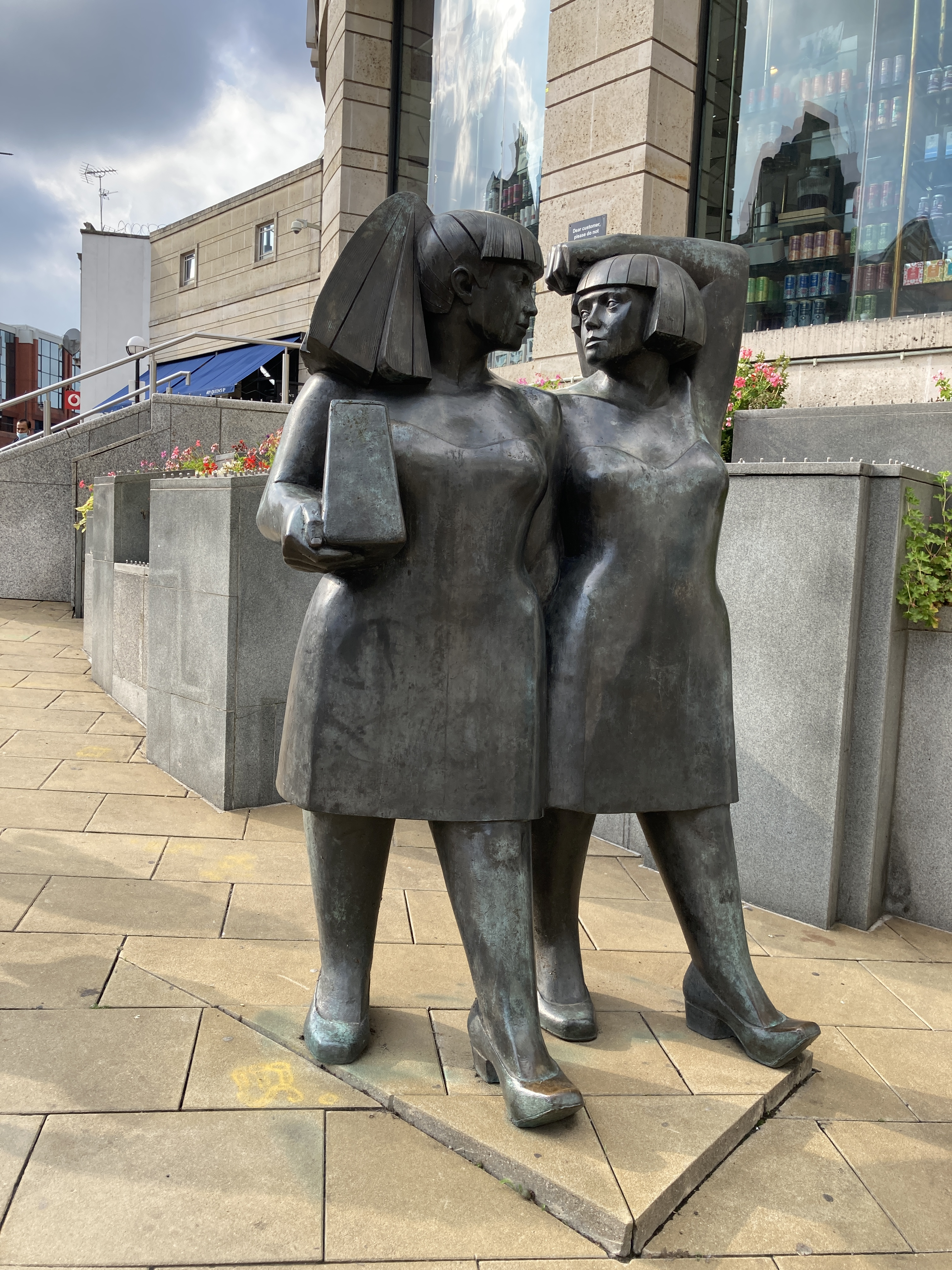
"Walking Women", in Wimbledon

Wallace's works include the following:

A bronze statue of Thomas Telford, in Telford Square in Telford, Shropshire, was unveiled in 1988 by William Francis, president of the Institution of Civil Engineers. The installation, including the name "Telford" in large letters, was made in collaboration with Glynwed Foundries Ltd. The statue leans of the "o" of his name and his coat hangs on the "d".

"Walking Women", in the Centre Court Shopping Centre in Wimbledon, London, was unveiled in 1992. There are two over-life size statues of patinated bronze, height 2.40 metres (7 ft 10 in).

"Siren" and "River God", of 1996, are in Sandgate, Newcastle upon Tyne. They were commissioned by Tyne and Wear Development Corporation, and are half-length bronze statues on steel columns. Siren, overlooking Newcastle Quayside, is gazing at the River God in the distance, who is apparently blowing at her.

"Boatman", unveiled in 2005, is in High Street, Chepstow, Monmouthshire. It was commissioned by Monmouthshire County Council as part of the town's regeneration scheme, and celebrates the town's fishing industry. It is a bronze figure, height 2.44 metres (8 ft 0 in), on a stone representation of a boat.
