= William Huskisson =

British statesman, financier and MP (1770–1830)

The Right Honourable William Huskisson
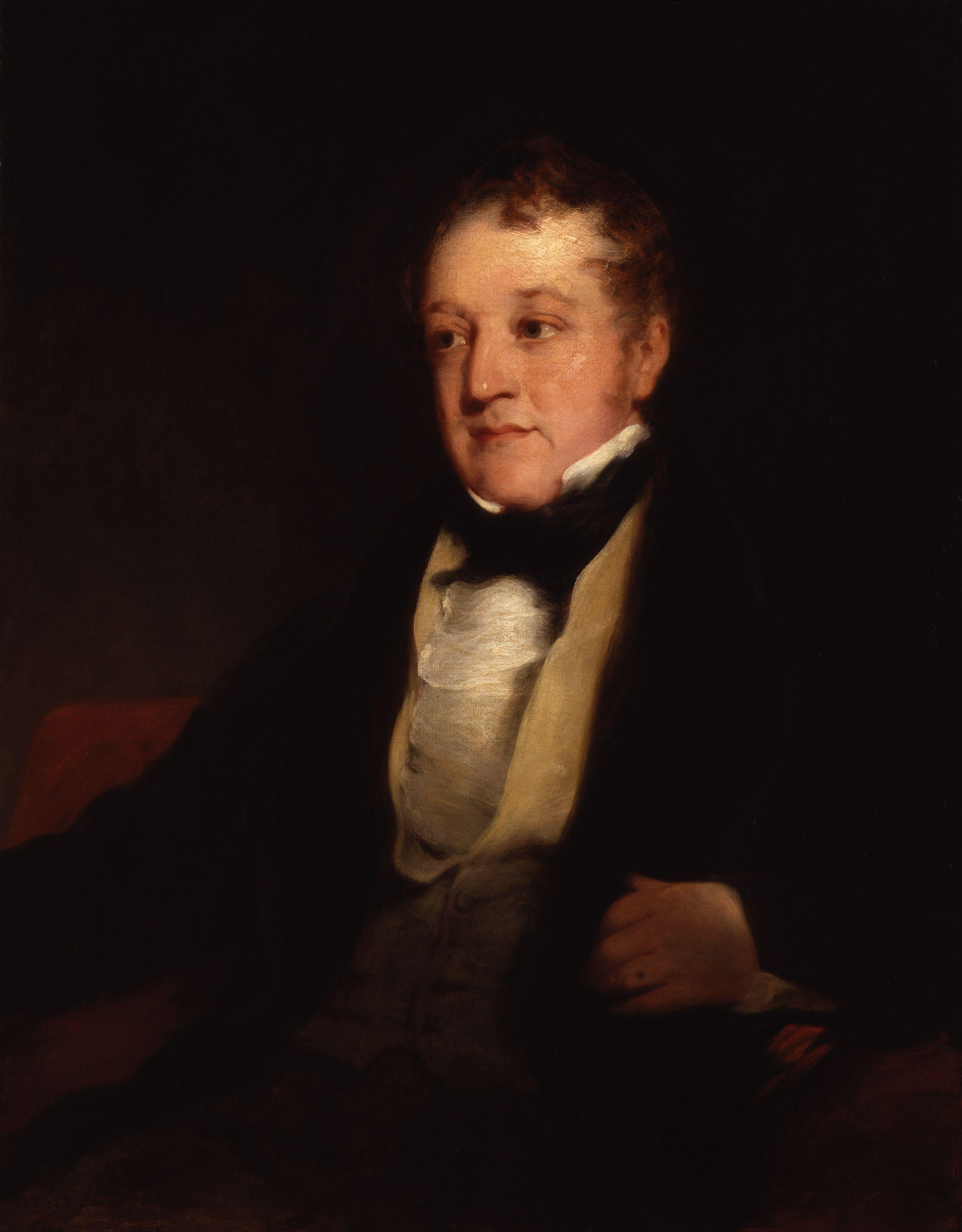
- Portrait by Richard Rothwell

Secretary of State for War and the Colonies
- In office 3 September 1827 – 30 May 1828
- Prime Minister: The Viscount Goderich; The Duke of Wellington
- Preceded by: The Viscount Goderich
- Succeeded by: Sir George Murray

Leader of the House of Commons
- In office 3 September 1827 – 26 January 1828
- Prime Minister: The Viscount Goderich
- Preceded by: George Canning
- Succeeded by: Robert Peel

President of the Board of Trade
- In office 21 February 1823 – 3 September 1827
- Prime Minister: The Earl of Liverpool; George Canning
- Preceded by: Frederick John Robinson
- Succeeded by: Charles Grant

Member of Parliament for Liverpool
- In office 15 February 1823 – 15 September 1830
- Preceded by: George Canning
- Succeeded by: William Ewart

Personal details
- Born: 11 March 1770 Birtsmorton Court, Malvern, Worcestershire
- Died: 15 September 1830 (aged 60) Eccles, Lancashire
- Spouse: Emily Milbanke (d. 1856)

William Huskisson PC (11 March 1770 – 15 September 1830) was a British statesman, financier, and Member of Parliament for several constituencies, including Liverpool.

He is commonly known as the world's first widely reported railway passenger casualty, since he was run over and fatally injured by Robert Stephenson's pioneering locomotive Rocket at the opening of the Liverpool and Manchester Railway in 1830. However, a number of fatal railway accidents had already occurred before this.

== Early life ==
Huskisson was born at Birtsmorton Court, Malvern, Worcestershire, the son of William and Elizabeth Huskisson, both members of Staffordshire families. He was one of four brothers. After their mother Elizabeth died, their father William eventually remarried and had further children by his second wife.

Huskisson was a student at Appleby Grammar School, a boarding school designed by Sir Christopher Wren in Leicestershire. In 1783, he was sent to Paris to live with his maternal great-uncle Dr. Richard Gem, who was physician to the British embassy there. He remained in Paris until 1792, and his experience as an eyewitness to the prelude and beginning of the French Revolution gave him a lifelong interest in politics. Huskisson first came to public notice while still in Paris. As a supporter of the moderate party, he became a member of the "Club of 1789", which favoured making France into a constitutional monarchy. On 29 August 1790, he delivered a speech entitled "Sur les Assignats", about the issue of assignats by the French government. This speech gave him a reputation as an expert in finance. From 1790 to 1792, the Marquess of Stafford was the British ambassador to Paris. Huskisson became a protégé of the Marquess, and returned to London with him.

== Political career ==
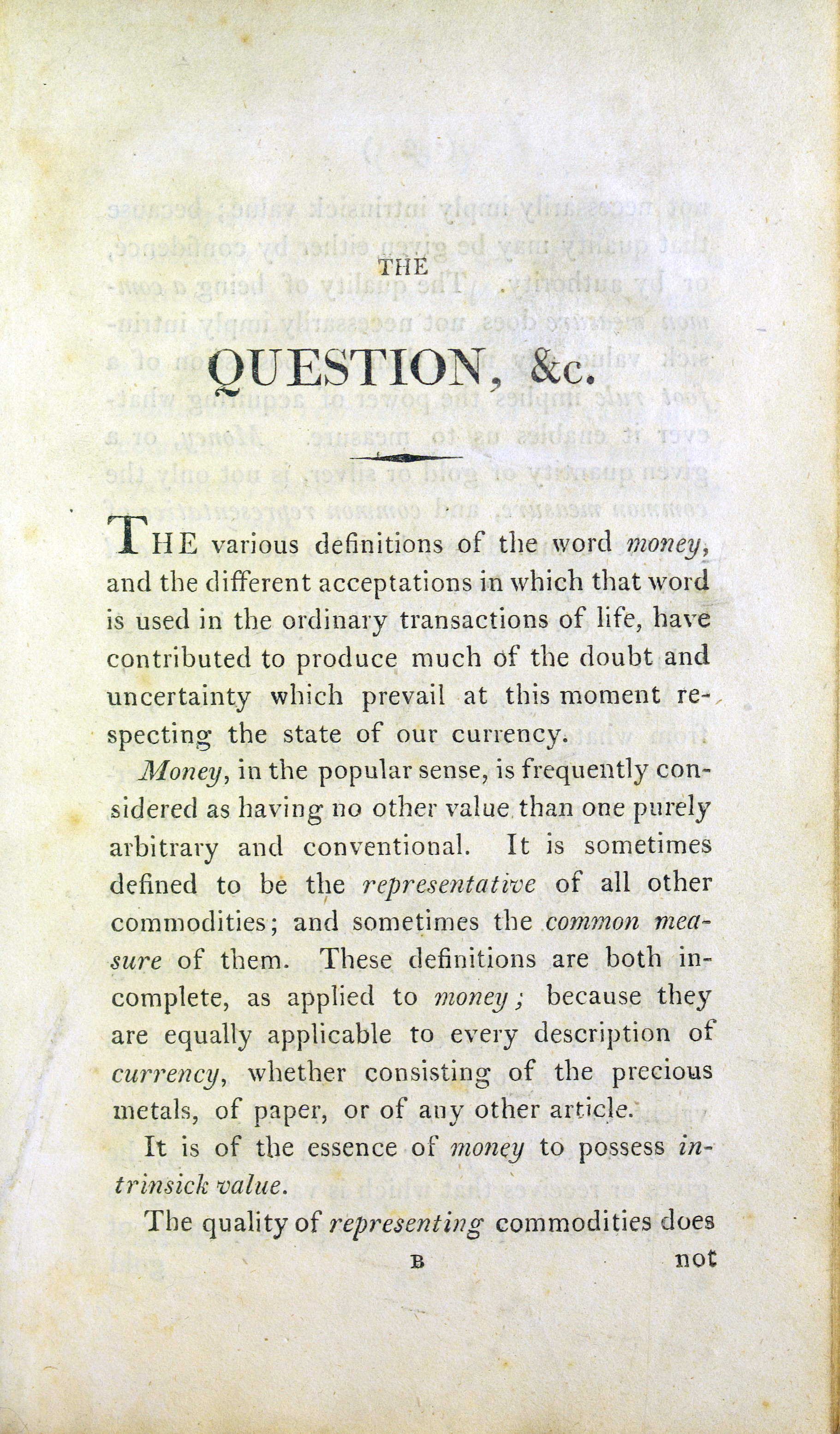
Question concerning the depreciation of our currency, 1810

Once in London, Huskisson quickly gained an additional two powerful political patrons: Henry Dundas, the Home Secretary, and William Pitt the Younger, the Prime Minister. Because of Huskisson's fluency in French, Dundas appointed him in January 1793 to oversee the execution of the Aliens Act, which mostly dealt with French refugees. In the discharge of his delicate duties, he manifested such ability that in 1795 he was appointed Under-Secretary at War (the Secretary at War's deputy).

In 1796 he entered Parliament as member for Morpeth, but for a considerable period he took scarcely any part in the debates. In 1800 he inherited a fortune from Dr Gem. On the retirement of Pitt in 1801 he resigned office, and after contesting Dover unsuccessfully he withdrew for a time into private life. Having in 1804 been chosen to represent Liskeard, he was appointed secretary of the treasury on the restoration of the Pitt ministry, holding office till the dissolution of the ministry after the death of Pitt in January 1806.

After being elected for Harwich in 1807, he accepted the same office under the Duke of Portland, but he withdrew from the ministry along with Canning in 1809. In the following year he published a pamphlet on the currency system, which confirmed his reputation as the ablest financier of his time; but his free-trade principles did not accord with those of his party. In 1812 he was returned for Chichester.

When in 1814 he re-entered government, it was only as First Commissioner of Woods and Forests, but his influence was from this time very great in the commercial and financial legislation of the country. He took a prominent part in the debates over the Corn Laws in 1814 and 1815; and in 1819 he presented a memorandum to Lord Liverpool advocating a large reduction in the unfunded debt, and explaining a method for the resumption of cash payments, which was embodied in the act passed the same year. In 1821 he was a member of the committee appointed to inquire into the causes of the agricultural distress then prevailing, and the proposed relaxation of the Corn Laws embodied in the report was understood to have been chiefly due to his strenuous advocacy.

In 1823 he was appointed President of the Board of Trade and Treasurer of the Navy, and shortly afterwards he received a seat in the cabinet. In the same year he was returned for Liverpool as successor to Canning, and as the only man who could reconcile the Tory merchants to a free trade policy. Among the more important legislative changes with which he was principally connected were a reform of the Navigation Acts, admitting other nations to a full equality and reciprocity of shipping duties; the repeal of the labour laws; the introduction of a new sinking fund; the reduction of the duties on manufactures and on the importation of foreign goods, and the repeal of the quarantine duties.

In 1826 after the Power-loom riots, a number of manufacturers subsequently agreed to pay a standard rate to the weavers, but on their own admission it was a "starvation" wage. Those who stuck to the agreement found it difficult to compete with those manufacturers who did not, and could therefore undercut them, prompting an appeal to William Huskisson, the President of the Board of Trade, to introduce a legally binding minimum wage. Huskisson's response was dismissive, expressing his view that to introduce such a measure would be "a vain and hazardous attempt to impose the authority of the law between the labourer and his employer in regulating the demand for labour and the price to be paid for it".

In accordance with his suggestion Canning in 1827 introduced a measure on the corn laws proposing the adoption of a sliding scale to regulate the amount of duty. A misapprehension between Huskisson and the Duke of Wellington led to the duke proposing an amendment, the success of which caused the abandonment of the measure by the government.

After the death of Canning in the same year Huskisson accepted the secretaryship of the colonies under Lord Goderich, an office which he continued to hold in the new cabinet formed by the Duke of Wellington in the following year. After succeeding with great difficulty in inducing the cabinet to agree to a compromise on the corn laws, Huskisson finally resigned office in May 1828 on account of a difference with his colleagues in regard to the disfranchisement of East Retford. He was followed out of the government by other Tories who are usually described as Canningites including Lord Palmerston, Charles Grant and Lord Dudley.

In 1827, as Secretary of State for the Colonies, Huskisson confirmed the Consolidated Slave Law, which had been proposed by the anti-abolitionist leaders in Barbados in 1824 and which had been enacted in 1826 by the Barbadian colonial legislature.

== Death ==
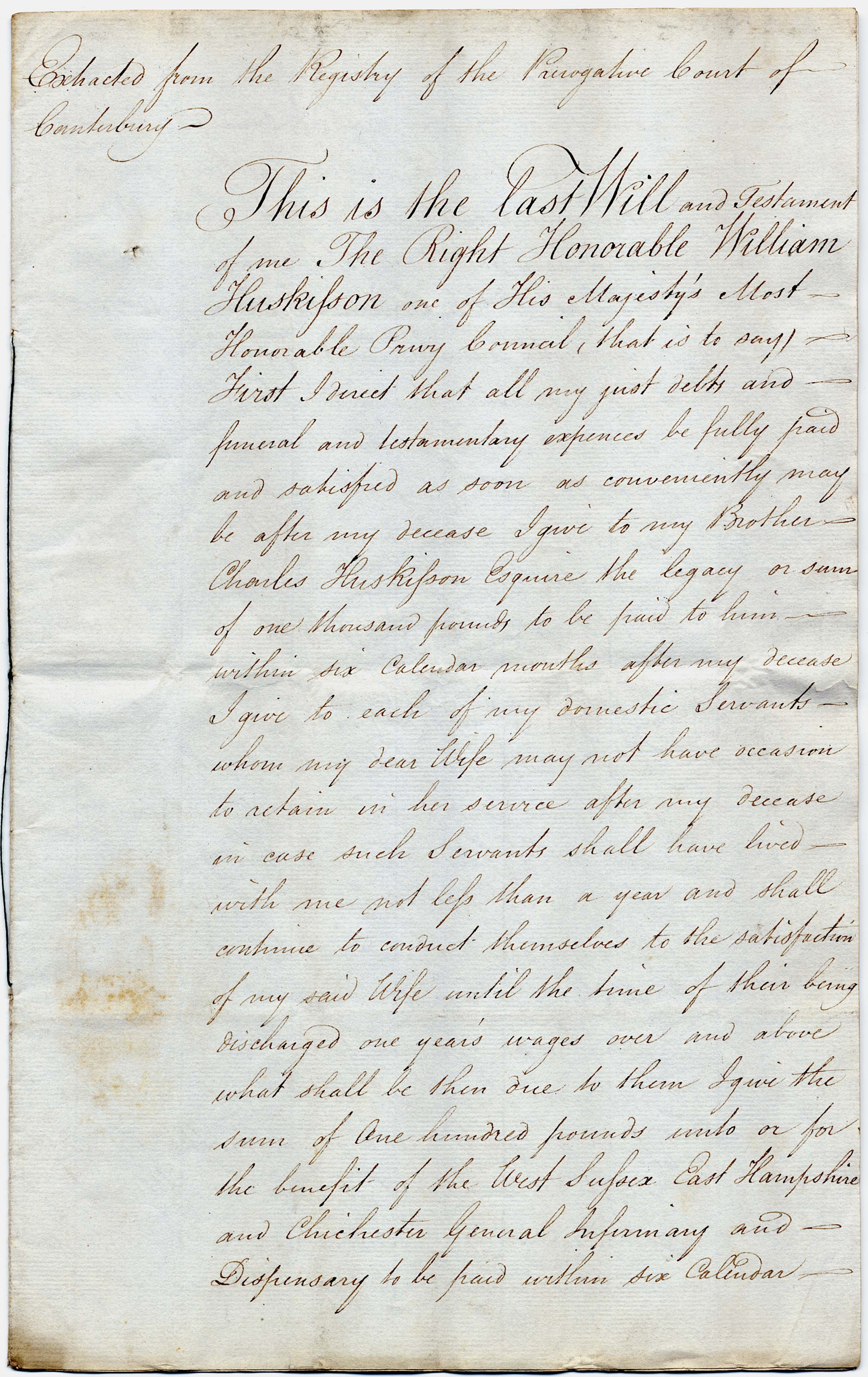
Page 1 of the last will of William Huskisson

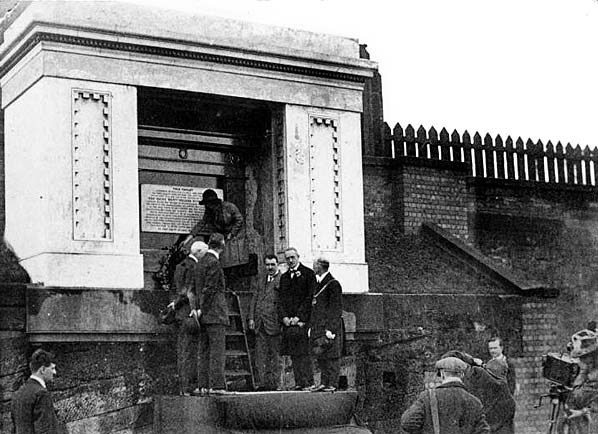
Photograph of the memorial erected at Parkside station in 1833

Huskisson had been diagnosed with strangury, a tender inflammation of the kidneys. He had undergone surgery, and had been advised by Royal doctor William George Maton to cancel all forthcoming appointments, which included the opening of the Liverpool and Manchester Railway. Huskisson chose to ignore this advice, believing the opening event too important to avoid. He rode down the line in a special train constructed for the Duke of Wellington and his guests and dignitaries, pulled by the locomotive Northumbrian which was driven by George Stephenson himself. This train was the only train on the south track; the other seven were in procession on the northern track. At Parkside railway station, near the midpoint of the line, the locomotives made a scheduled stop to take on fuel and water. Although the company had implicitly warned passengers to remain on the trains while this took place, around 50 of the dignitaries on board alighted when the Duke of Wellington's special train stopped. One of those who got off was Huskisson, who approached the Duke to take this opportunity to repair their relationship after a great falling out, which resulted in Huskisson leaving the government, and shook his hand.

At this time the train being pulled by Rocket approached on the other line. Rocket was being driven by Joseph Locke, George Stephenson's assistant and future eminent engineer in his own right. A shout went up, "An engine is approaching. Take care, gentlemen!" The other disembarked passengers either climbed back into their seats, or stepped over the northern line and completely out of the way. A third option was available, to stand with one's back to the stationary coaches, as there was a four-foot gap between the lines, and even though the Duke's private carriage was wider than a then-standard carriage, it would have still been possible to stand between the stationary train and the travelling train and remain safe. (Indeed, at least two of those present, including the Tory MP and whip William Holmes, took this course of action in order to avoid the moving train). However, what unfolded was a calamitous series of events. Huskisson was known to be clumsy, and had endured a long list of problems from his regular trips and falls; he had twice broken his arm and never fully recovered the use of it. Added to this, he was only a few weeks post surgery and was present against his doctor's advice.

On realising his danger, he panicked and made two attempts to cross the other line, but changed his mind and returned to the Duke's carriage. At this point Joseph Locke became aware and threw Rocket into reverse, but it would have taken 10 seconds to have any effect. Huskisson then panicked that the gap between the two trains was not big enough and so tried to clamber into the Duke's carriage. However, the carriage door had not been latched, and so it slowly swung open, leaving him hanging directly in the path of the oncoming Rocket, which hit the door, throwing Huskisson onto the tracks in front of the train. His leg was horrifically mangled by the locomotive.

A door was ripped from a railway building and Huskisson was placed on it, and George Stephenson uncoupled Northumbrian from the Duke's train and coupled it to a small carriage that had been occupied by a band; the mortally injured MP was placed inside with a small group of friends. They set off to Eccles and walked from the station to the vicarage, where a doctor was called. A tourniquet had been applied, but it was not deemed possible to do a field amputation, so he was made comfortable with the assistance of the vicar's wife Emma Blackburne, whose "activity, sense & conduct" were mentioned in The Manchester Courier and The Times and remembered with gratitude by Huskisson's widow Emily who arrived at the vicarage from Liverpool. Huskisson was able to make his will and at 9 pm he died from his injury.

The death and funeral of Huskisson led to wide reporting on the opening of the railway, for the first time making people around the world aware that cheap and rapid long-distance transport was now possible, if dangerous.

== Family and commemorations ==
On 6 April 1799, Huskisson married Emily Milbanke, the younger daughter of Mark Milbanke, the commander-in-chief at Portsmouth. Emily Huskisson survived her husband and did not remarry, dying in April 1856. They had no children. In 1800 Huskisson bought Eartham House in West Sussex from his friend William Hayley, and is commemorated in the parish church by a long carved eulogy from Emily on the south wall.

The monument where his remains are buried is the centrepiece of St James Cemetery, Liverpool. A marble statue of him was housed in a mausoleum there until 1968, when it was transferred to the Walker Art Gallery in Liverpool.

In 1836, Emily also commissioned a second marble statue for the Custom House in Liverpool, but this statue was instead placed in the Royal Exchange, London where it was unveiled in 1848, and later moved after 1915 to Pimlico Gardens in Pimlico, London, between Grosvenor Road and the river Thames. A bronze casting of this statue was unveiled outside the Custom House in 1847. Following the destruction of the Custom House in an air raid in 1940, the statue was moved to the boulevard of Princes Road and Princes Avenue in Toxteth in 1954, but was pulled down by protestors in 1982 on account of Huskisson's opposition to the abolition of slave-owning as M.P. for Liverpool (although earlier, as M.P. for Liskeard in 1807, he had voted for abolition of slave-trading); a plaque explaining this was erected on the empty plinth in 2020. After being pulled down, the statue was relocated to the Oratory, but following conservation in 2004 it was moved to Dukes Terrace in the city centre.

In the early 1840s, the town of Huskisson, New South Wales was named after Huskisson by the Governor of New South Wales, Sir George Gipps.

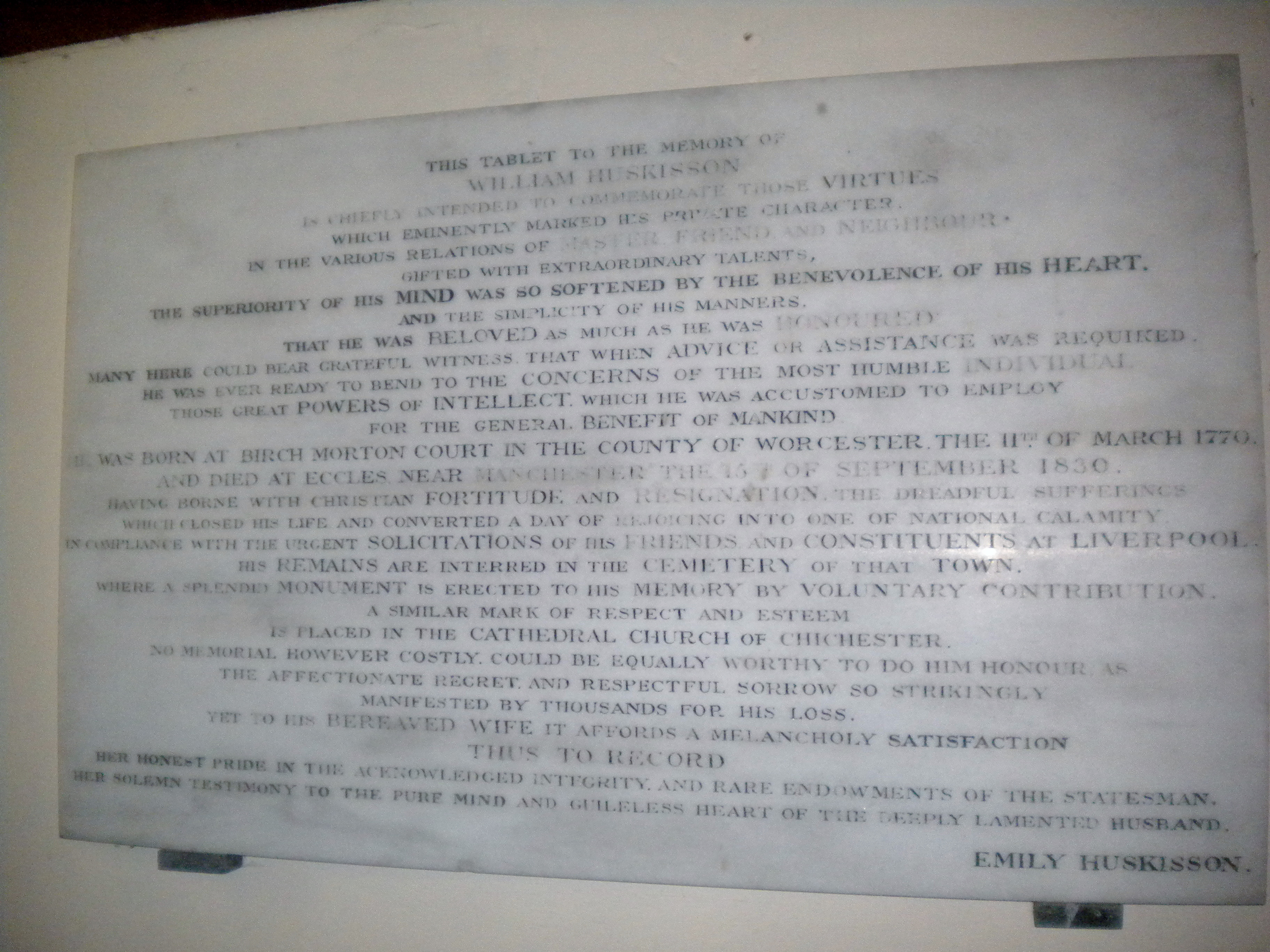
Eartham Church plaque erected by Huskisson's wife Emily

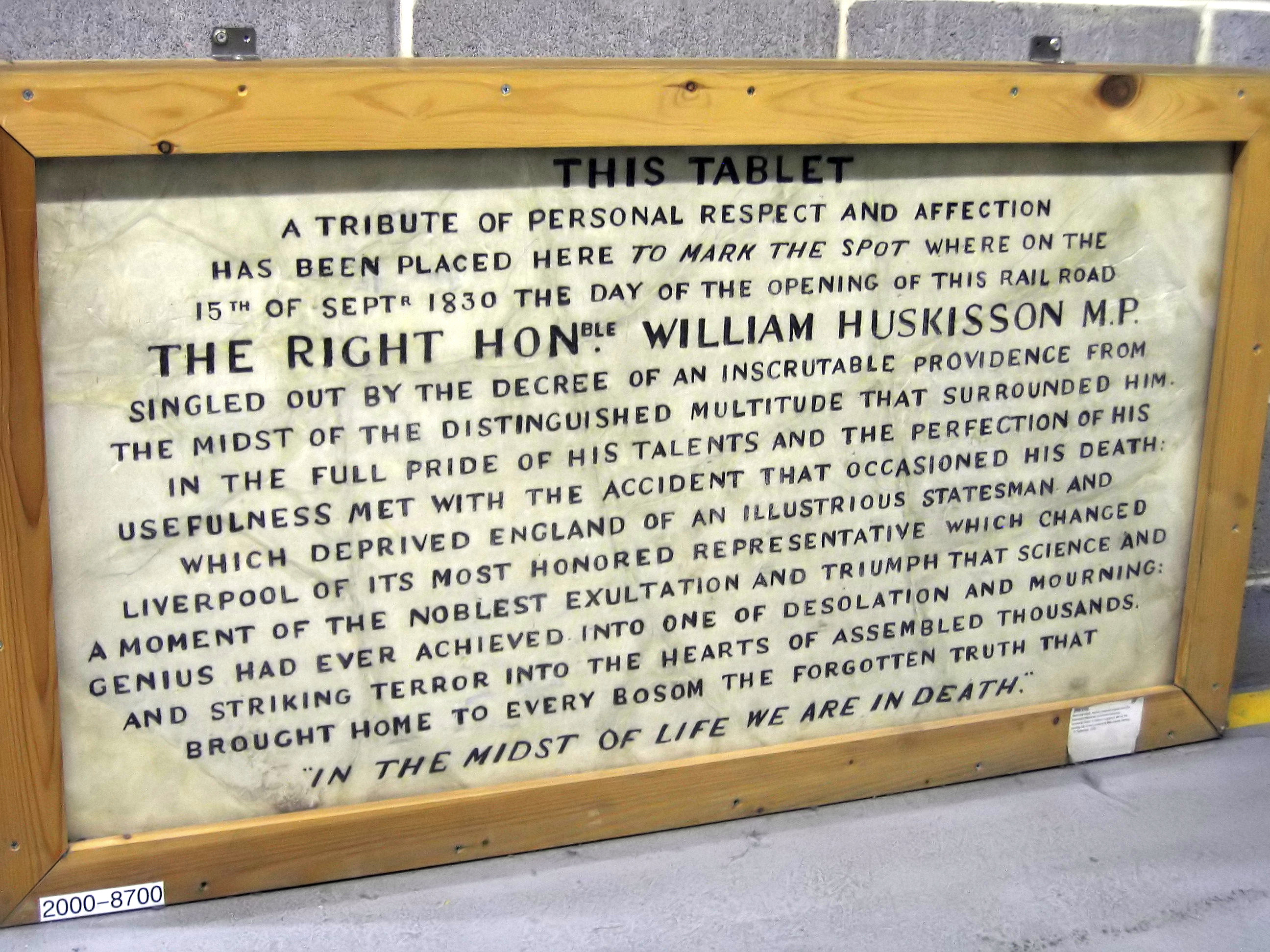
Tablet erected at Parkside station, the site of the accident, in 1833; now in the National Railway Museum, York

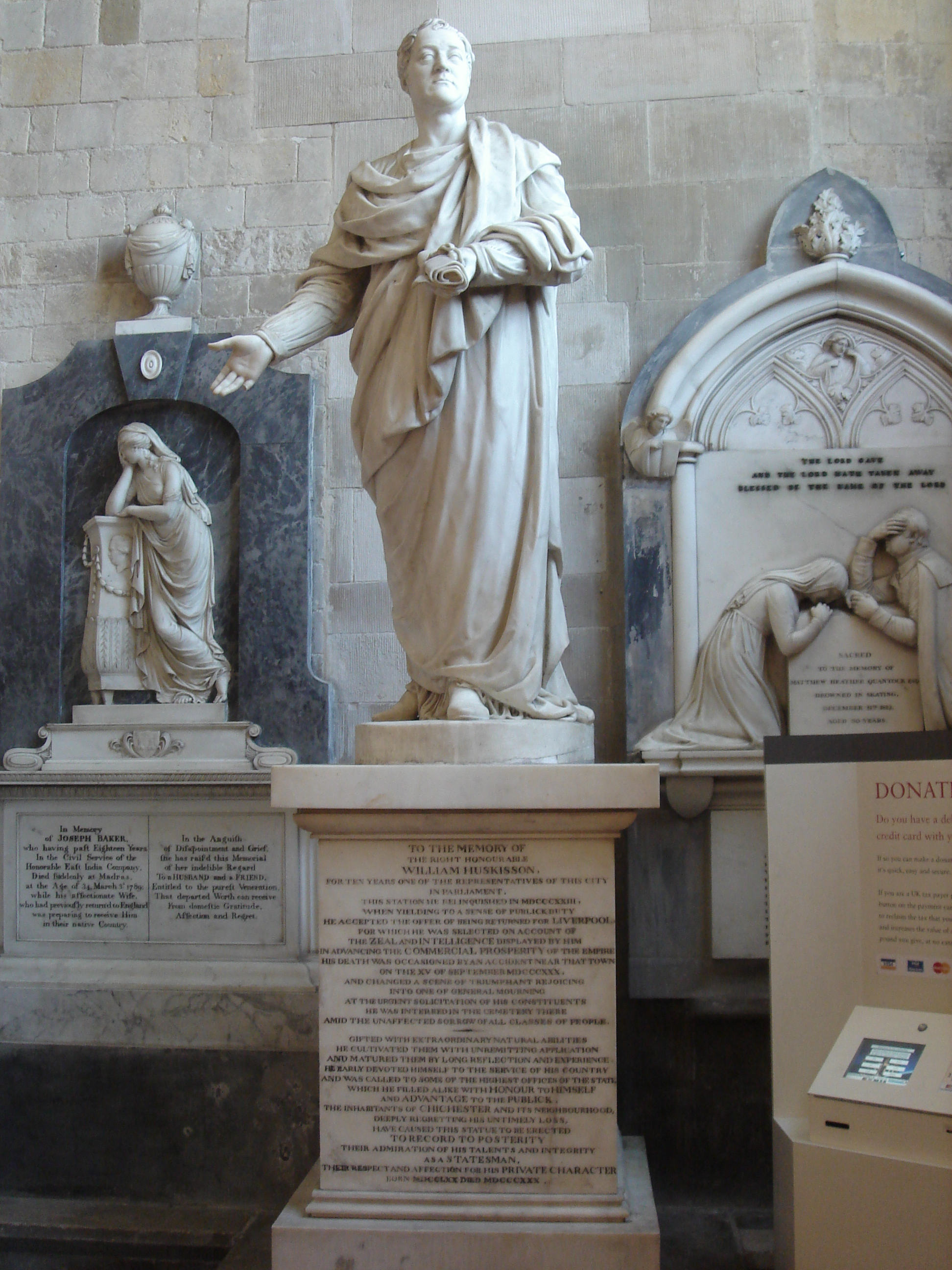
Statue in Chichester Cathedral

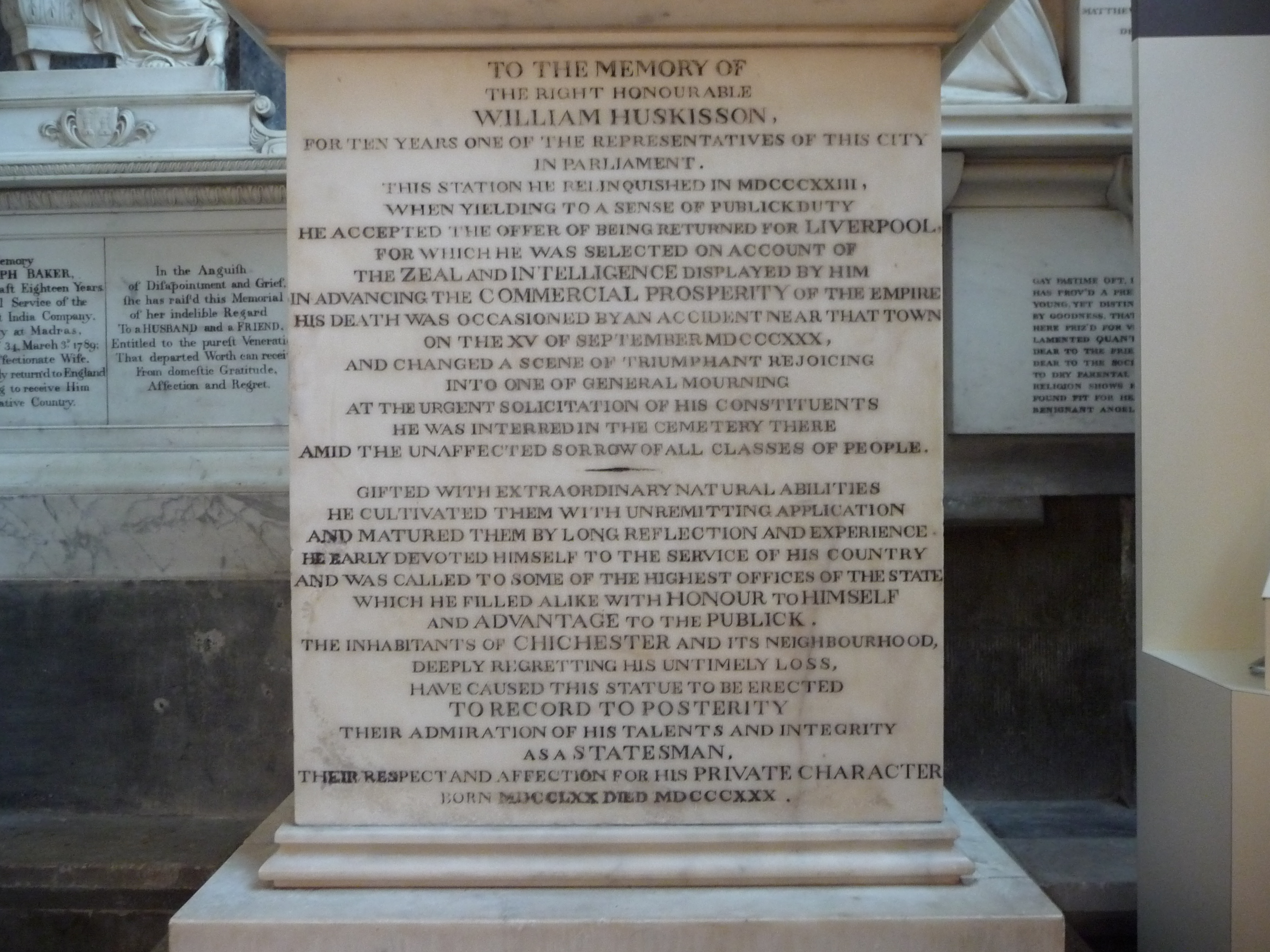
Inscription on the Chichester Cathedral statue

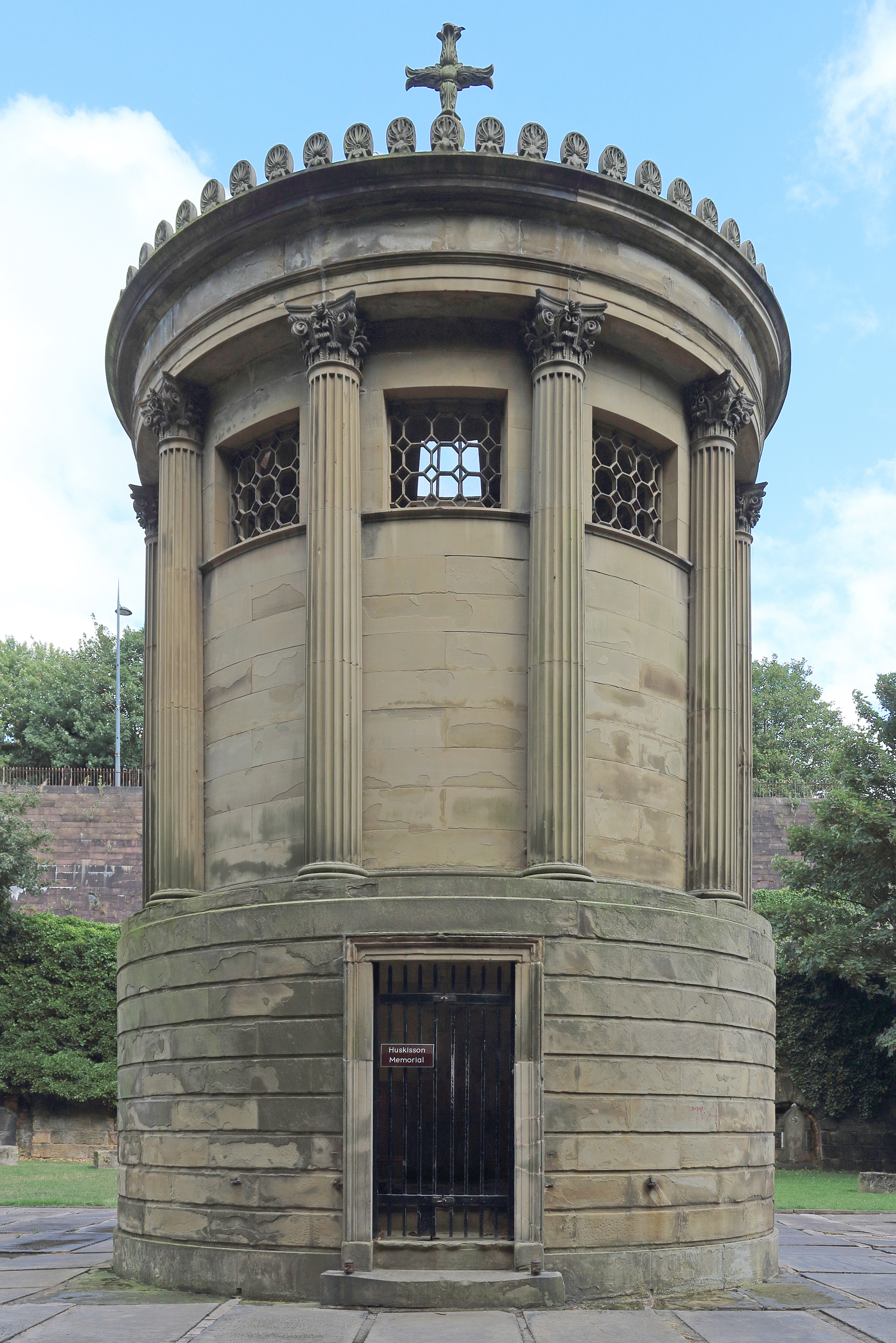
Huskisson monument, St James Cemetery, Liverpool

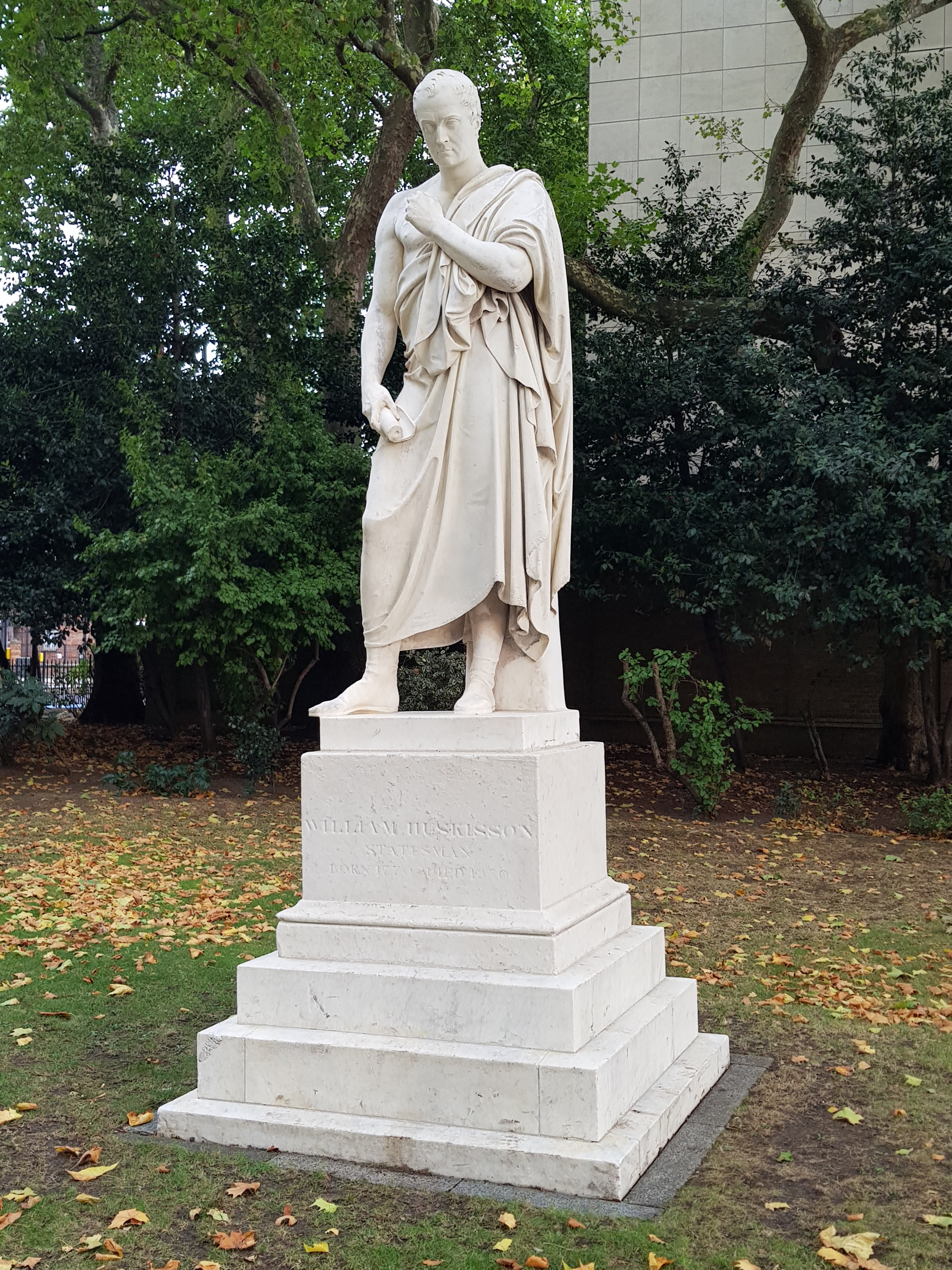
Statue of Huskisson in Pimlico Gardens, Pimlico, London

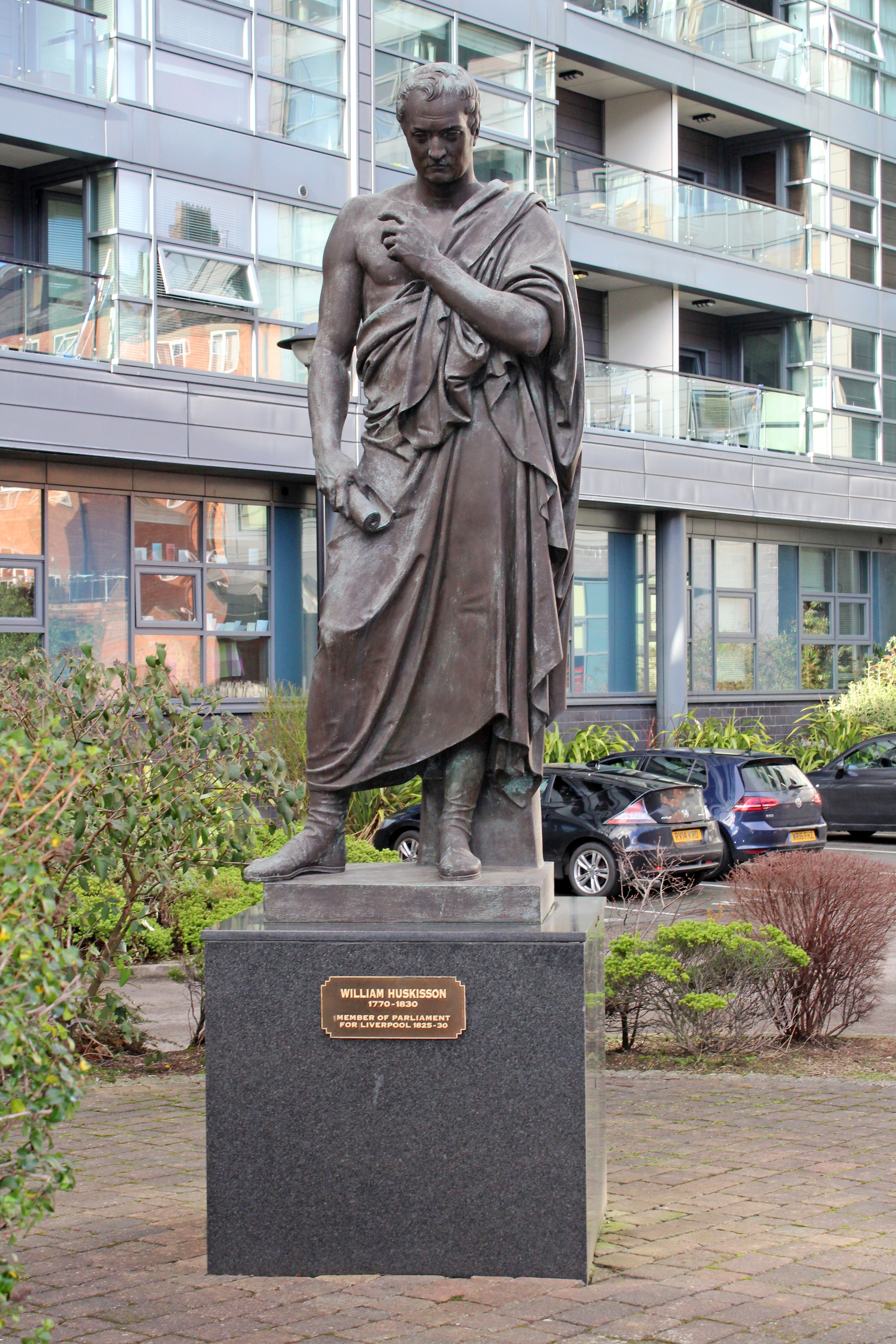
Statue of Huskisson in Dukes Terrace, Liverpool

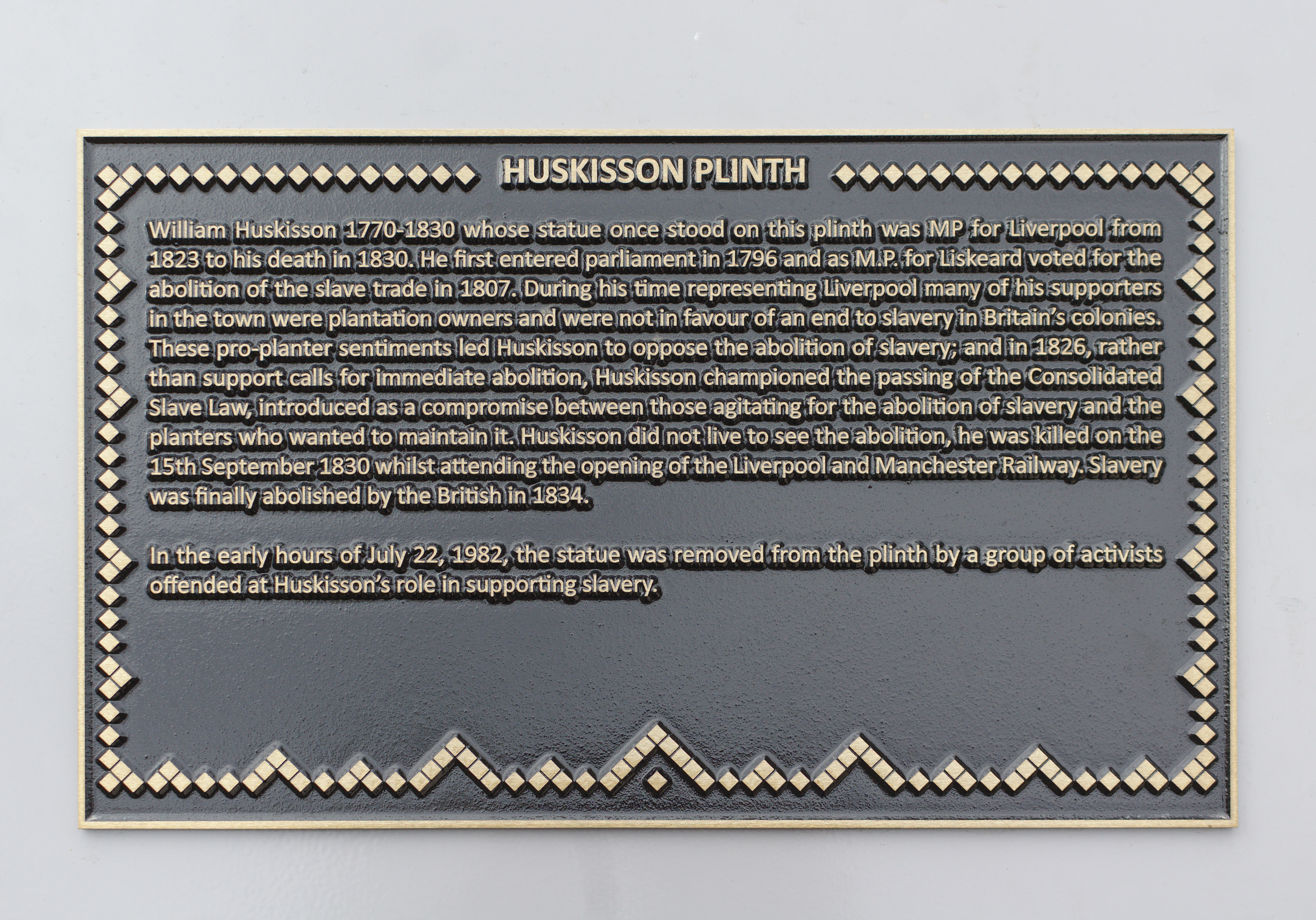
Plaque now displayed on the empty plinth on Princes Road, Toxteth, explaining Huskisson's opposition to the abolition of the slave trade

== See also ==
- Lists of rail accidents
- Huskisson, New South Wales, a town named after William Huskisson
- List of statues and sculptures in Liverpool
- Consolidated Slave Law

Parliament of Great Britain
Preceded by Sir James Erskine, Bt; Viscount Morpeth	Member of Parliament for Morpeth; 1796–1800 with Viscount Morpeth	Succeeded by Parliament of the United Kingdom
Parliament of the United Kingdom
Preceded by Parliament of Great Britain	Member of Parliament for Morpeth; 1801–1802 with Viscount Morpeth	Succeeded by Viscount Morpeth; William Ord
Preceded by Hon. John Eliot; Hon. William Eliot	Member of Parliament for Liskeard; 1804–1807 with Hon. William Eliot	Succeeded by William Eliot; Viscount Hamilton
Preceded by John Hiley Addington; James Adams	Member of Parliament for Harwich; 1807–1812 with John Hiley Addington	Succeeded by John Hiley Addington; Nicholas Vansittart
Preceded by George White-Thomas; James du Pre	Member of Parliament for Chichester; 1812–1823 with The Earl of March 1812–1819; Lord John Lennox 1819–1823	Succeeded by Lord John Lennox; William Stephen Poyntz
Preceded by Isaac Gascoyne; George Canning	Member of Parliament for Liverpool; 1823–1830 with Isaac Gascoyne	Succeeded by Isaac Gascoyne; William Ewart
Political offices
Preceded by Sir Evan Nepean, Bt	Under-Secretary of State for War; 1795–1801	Succeeded by John Sullivan as Under-Secretary of State for War and the Colonies
Preceded by Nicholas Vansittart	Secretary to the Treasury (senior); 1804–1806	Succeeded by Nicholas Vansittart
Preceded by Nicholas Vansittart	Secretary to the Treasury (senior); 1807–1809	Succeeded by Richard Wharton
Preceded by The Lord Glenbervie	First Commissioner of Woods and Forests; 1814–1823	Succeeded by Charles Arbuthnot
Preceded by Hon. Frederick John Robinson	President of the Board of Trade; 1823–1827	Succeeded by Charles Grant
Preceded by Hon. Frederick John Robinson	Treasurer of the Navy; 1823–1827	Succeeded by Charles Grant
Preceded by The Viscount Goderich	Secretary of State for War and the Colonies; 1827–1828	Succeeded by Sir George Murray
Preceded by George Canning	Leader of the House of Commons; 1827–1828	Succeeded by Robert Peel
