= Beloe =

Beloe may refer to:

== People ==
- Gerald Beloe (1877–1944), English cricket player
- William Beloe (1756–1817), English writer
- William Beloe (Royal Navy officer) (1909–1966), British navy officer

== Other ==
- Beloe Report
- Krasnoe & Beloe
