= St Peter's Church, Petersham =

Church in Richmond upon Thames, London

Petersham Parish Church
- St Peter's, Petersham
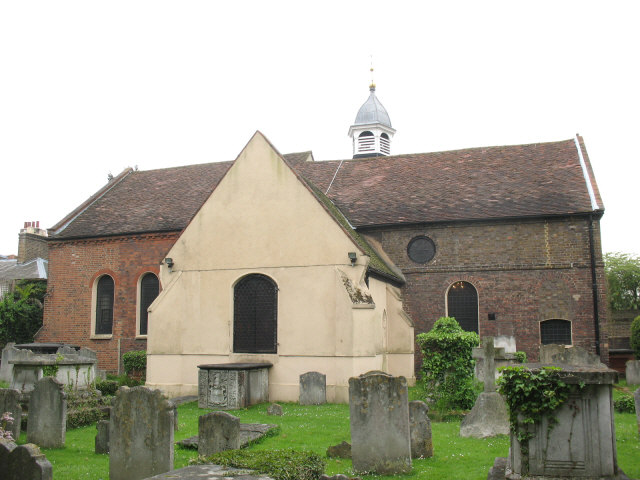
- St Peter's parish church, Petersham in 2008

- Location in Richmond upon Thames
- 51°26′48″N 0°18′05″W
- Country: England
- Denomination: Church of England
- Churchmanship: Central

History
- Founded: Saxon times. Part of the chancel in the present building dates from 1266; the main body of the church was rebuilt in 1505

Administration
- Diocese: Southwark
- Archdeaconry: Wandsworth
- Deanery: Richmond & Barnes
- Parish: St Peter's, Petersham

Listed Building – Grade II*
- Official name: Parish Church of St Peter
- Designated: 10 January 1950
- Reference no.: 1065334

St Peter's Church is the parish church of the village of Petersham in the London Borough of Richmond upon Thames. It is part of the Diocese of Southwark in the Church of England. The main body of the church building dates from the 16th century, although parts of the chancel date from the 13th century, and evidence in Domesday Book suggests that there may have been a church on the site in Saxon times. Nikolaus Pevsner and Bridget Cherry describe it as a "church of uncommon charm... [whose] interior is well preserved in its pre-Victorian state".

The church, which is Grade II* listed, includes Georgian box pews, a two-decker pulpit made in 1796, and a relief of the royal arms of the House of Hanover, installed in 1810. Its classical organ was installed at the south end in late 2009 by the Swiss builders Manufacture d'Orgues St Martin of Neuchâtel, and a separate parish room was added in 2018. Many notable people are buried in the churchyard, which includes some Grade II-listed tombs.

== Marriages at St Peter's ==
Prince Rupert of the Rhine, cousin of Charles II, is said to have married, at Petersham in 1664, Lady Francesca Bard, mother of his son Dudley Bard (born c. 1666).

Elizabeth Murray, Countess of Dysart, who lived at Ham House, married her second husband, John Maitland, 1st Duke of Lauderdale, in 1672.

Lady Jane Hyde, daughter of Henry Hyde, Earl of Rochester, married William Capell, 3rd Earl of Essex at the church on 27 November 1718. Sir Godfrey Kneller's portrait of her is held at the Watford Museum.

Claude Bowes-Lyon, Lord Glamis and Cecilia Cavendish-Bentinck, who lived at Forbes House on Ham Common, married at the church in 1881. Their daughter, Elizabeth Bowes-Lyon, married the Duke of York in 1923 and became Queen Elizabeth in 1936 when the duke came to the throne as King George VI.

== Burials and memorials inside the church ==
Sir George Cole (d. 1624) and his family are commemorated in the monument in the chancel erected in 1624. He was called to the bar in 1597 and was a member of the Middle Temple. He married his wife Frances at St Peter's in 1585. The family vault is under the chancel.

There is a plaque to Sir Thomas Jenner (1637–1707), barrister, Baron of the Exchequer, and Justice of the Common Pleas, on the chancel wall.

There is a plaque inside St Peter's to Elizabeth Maitland, Duchess of Lauderdale (1626–1698), who became Countess of Dysart on the death of her father, William Murray, the owner of Ham House. She is buried with other Dysart family members in a vault under the chancel.

On one of the walls inside the church there is a memorial tablet, erected by the Hudson's Bay Company, to the explorer George Vancouver (1757–1798). There is also a memorial to Rear-Admiral Sir George Scott KCB (1770–1841).

There is a memorial inside the church to the Petersham Boy Scouts who died in the First World War, moved from the deconsecrated All Saints' Church, now a house, in 2007.

There is a memorial for Captain John Niel Randle VC (1917–1944), killed in action at Kohima in Assam.

== Burials and memorials in the churchyard ==
These people are buried in the churchyard:

=== 17th century ===
Lodowick Carlell (1602–1675), playwright, and his wife Joan Carlile (c. 1606–1679), portrait painter, who had lived at Petersham Lodge in Richmond Park, are buried together in the churchyard, but the location of their grave is not known.

The oldest headstone in the churchyard is that of Mary Karze (d. 1686). It is Grade II listed.

=== 18th century ===
Mary Burdekin (d. 1772), believed to be the first baker of Maids of Honour pastries, who had a shop in Hill Street, Richmond, was described as a "[p]astry cook who by her diligence industry and anxyous care to please acquired many friends and much esteem".

William Duckett MP (1685–1749) was a British Army officer and Whig politician who sat in the House of Commons from 1727 to 1741.

Frances Greville (c. 1724–1789) was an Anglo-Irish poet and celebrity in Georgian England.

Sir Thomas Jenner (1637–1707), barrister, Baron of the Exchequer, and Justice of the Common Pleas, died at Montrose House, his house in Petersham.

Nicholas Sprimont (1716–1771), silversmith who ran the Chelsea porcelain factory, the first important porcelain manufactory in England.

The explorer Captain George Vancouver (1757–1798) wrote A Voyage Of Discovery To The North Pacific Ocean, And Round The World when living in retirement in Petersham. His grave is Grade II listed.

=== 19th century ===
Henry Lidgbird Ball (1756–1818), a Royal Navy officer best known for discovering and exploring Lord Howe Island (in the Tasman Sea between Australia and New Zealand), is buried in the family vault of his wife, Anne Georgianna Henrietta Johnston. A plaque commemorating Ball was added to the Johnston tomb on 20 October 2013, at a service attended by the Australian High Commissioner to the United Kingdom.

Mary Berry (1763–1852), author and editor, and her sister Agnes Berry (1764–1852).

Major General Sir Jeremiah Bryant (1783–1845), a British Army officer in the Bengal Army.

Edward James Mortimer Collins (1827–1876) was an English novelist, journalist and poet. He died at Nightingale Hall, Richmond Hill, while visiting his son-in-law. There is no memorial stone.

Theodora Jane Cowper (d. 1824), cousin of the poet William Cowper.

Richard Edgcumbe, 2nd Earl of Mount Edgcumbe (1764–1839), politician and writer on music, is buried in a Grade II-listed tomb in the churchyard.

General Gordon Forbes (1738–1828), a senior officer in the British Army, died in a house on Ham Common that was later known as Gordon House.

Nathaniel Brassey Halhed (1751–1830), an orientalist and philologist, is buried in the family tomb in the churchyard. The family monument was erected by his half-brother, William Halhed.

Harriet Kerr, Marchioness of Lothian (d. 1833), daughter of Henry Scott, 3rd Duke of Buccleuch. Also Caroline Lucy Scott, Lady Scott (1784–1857), an English novelist and a landscape painter.

Lieutenant-General Sir William George Moore (1795–1862), who died at Montrose House, was the son of Francis Moore, a younger brother of General Sir John Moore. He served in the Peninsular War and was at the Battle of Waterloo.

Albert Henry Scott (1844–1865), photographer and third son of the architect George Gilbert Scott, who designed his tomb. It is Grade II listed.

Caroline Lucy Scott (1784–1857), novelist, religious writer and landscape painter. She was the wife of Admiral Sir George Scott, Vice Admiral of the Red.

Lord Charles Spencer (1740–1820), courtier and politician from the Spencer family. He died in Petersham while visiting his son.

Lieutenant-General Sir Charles Stuart (1753–1801), a nobleman and soldier, who captured Minorca from Spain in 1798.

Richard Taylor (1781–1858), naturalist and publisher of scientific journals, retired to Richmond in 1852.

=== 20th century ===
Robert Beloe (1905–1984), chief education officer for Surrey, produced the Beloe Report that led directly to the implementation of the Certificate of Secondary Education, the CSE examination, which existed from 1965 to 1987.

Maggie Black (1921–1999), author and food historian, published No Room for Tourists (1965), a semi-biographical account of life under apartheid, and went on to write several books on food history, such as The Medieval Cookbook (1992), as well as children's books.

Jonathan Cape (1879–1960), publisher, who founded the eponymous London publishing firm.

Major Edward Croft-Murray (1907–1980), antiquarian, expert on British art, and Keeper of the Department of Prints and Drawings at the British Museum from 1954 to 1973.

John Darbourne (1935–1991), architect who, together with fellow architect Geoffrey Darke, founded Darbourne & Darke in 1961.

Michael Derrick (1915–1961), a leading figure in Roman Catholic journalism in mid-20th-century England.

Sir John Whittaker Ellis (1829–1912) is buried in the churchyard and has a plaque in the north chancel. He was Lord Mayor of London from 1881 to 1882 and the first mayor of the Municipal Borough of Richmond (Surrey) from 1890 to 1891.

Elston Grey-Turner (1916–1984), a medical doctor, was secretary of the British Medical Association from 1976 to 1979.

Charles George Harper (1863–1943), author and illustrator, lived in Petersham at "Craigmyle" (The Navigator's House).

Sir Edmund Nuttall, Baronet (1870–1923), a civil engineer, was head of Edmund Nuttall Limited. He is buried along with his wife, Ethel Christine Nuttall (1871–1958).

A pink granite tomb marks the grave of painter and sculptor Glyn Philpot (1884–1937).

Dorothy Grenfell Williams Powell (1934–1994), radio producer and broadcaster, Head of the BBC African Service 1988–94. She is buried with her husband, Geoffry Powell (1920–1999), an architect with Chamberlin, Powell and Bon.

Businessman Anthony Rampton (1915–1993) and his wife Joan, both philanthropists, who lived at Gort Lodge.

Lieutenant-General Sir Arthur Thomas Sloggett (1857–1929), a doctor and British Army officer, is buried with his wife Helen.

Major General Sir Humphry Thomas Tollemache, 6th Baronet (1897–1990), senior Royal Marines officer, and his wife Nora Priscilla (née Taylor).

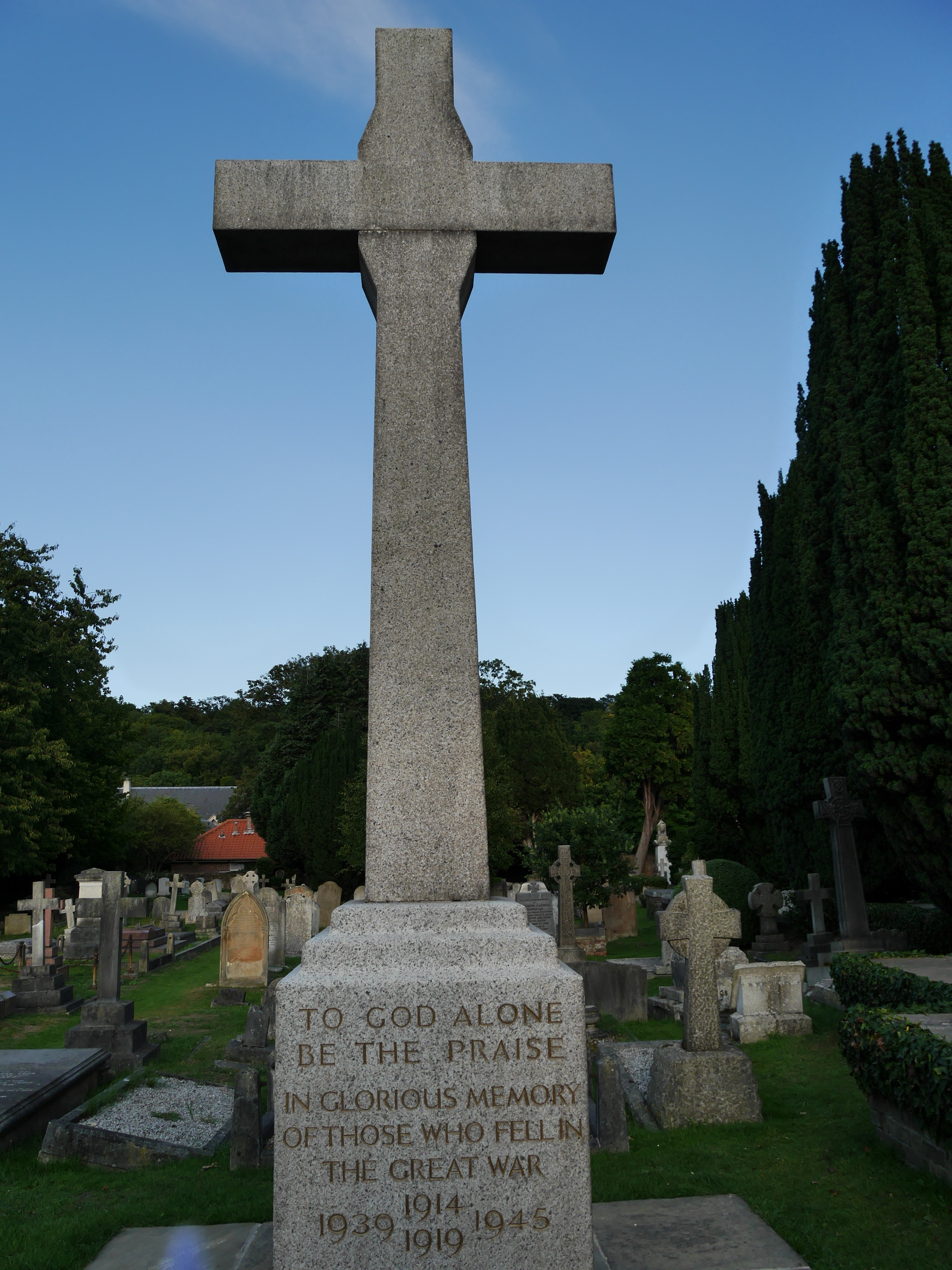
Petersham's war memorial in the churchyard

The local war memorial, in the form of a stone cross, is in the churchyard and is Grade II listed. The cemetery also contains the graves of four local men who died in the First World War: Sergeant G. Farren, Private M. Farren, Private F. C. Liddle, and Brevet Major the Rt. Hon. Algernon Henry C. Hanbury-Tracy.

=== 21st century ===
Chris Brasher (1928–2003), athlete, sports journalist, co-founder of the London Marathon, and Chairman of the Petersham Trust 1999–2003.

Jane Carolin Fawcett (1921–2016), codebreaker at Bletchley Park and "Protector of Historic Buildings and Landscapes", and her husband Edward "Ted" Fawcett (1920–2013), "Poet, Gardener", and head of public relations at The National Trust.

David Henry King (1941–2020), clinical vascular scientist.

Robin Patrick Langley (1942–2004), musicologist and, for 42 years, Petersham parish organist.

New Zealand artist Beth Zanders (1913–2009) and her husband, the New Zealand pianist Douglas Zanders (1918–2012).

== Gallery ==
=== Church interior ===
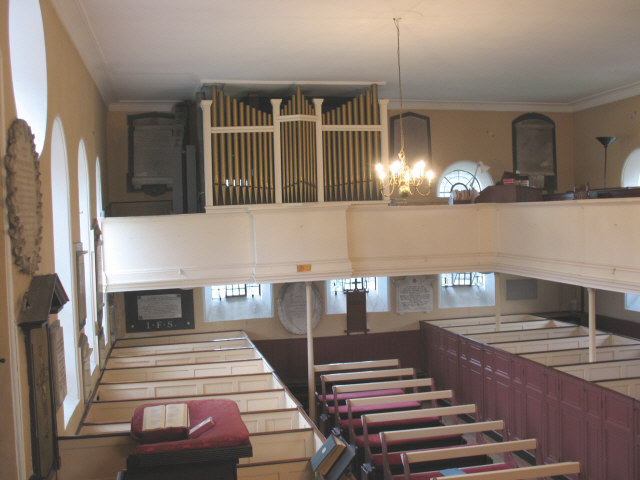
The interior of the church, showing the Georgian box pews and the unusual gallery organ

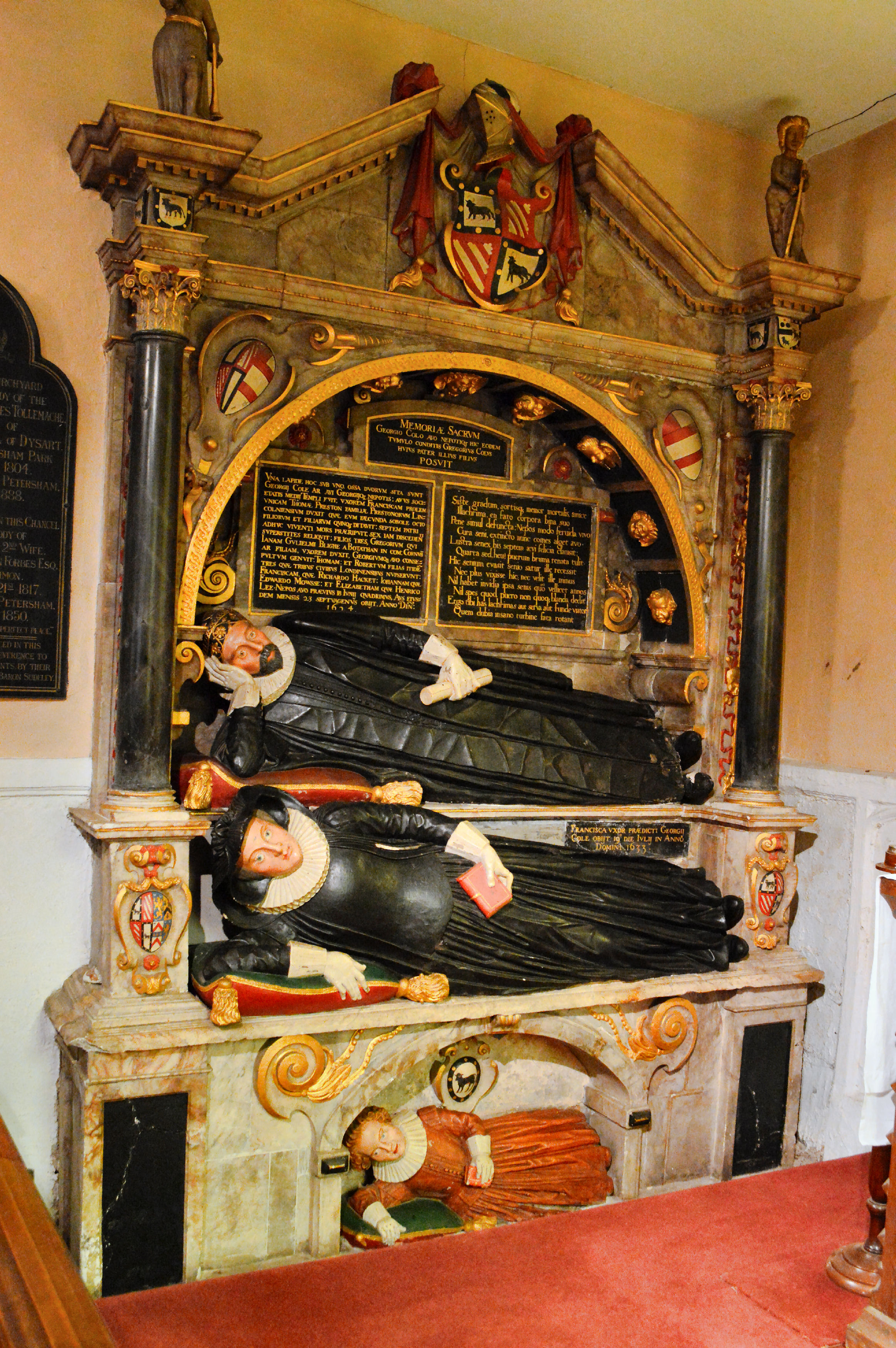
Memorial to Sir George Cole

=== Church exterior and churchyard ===
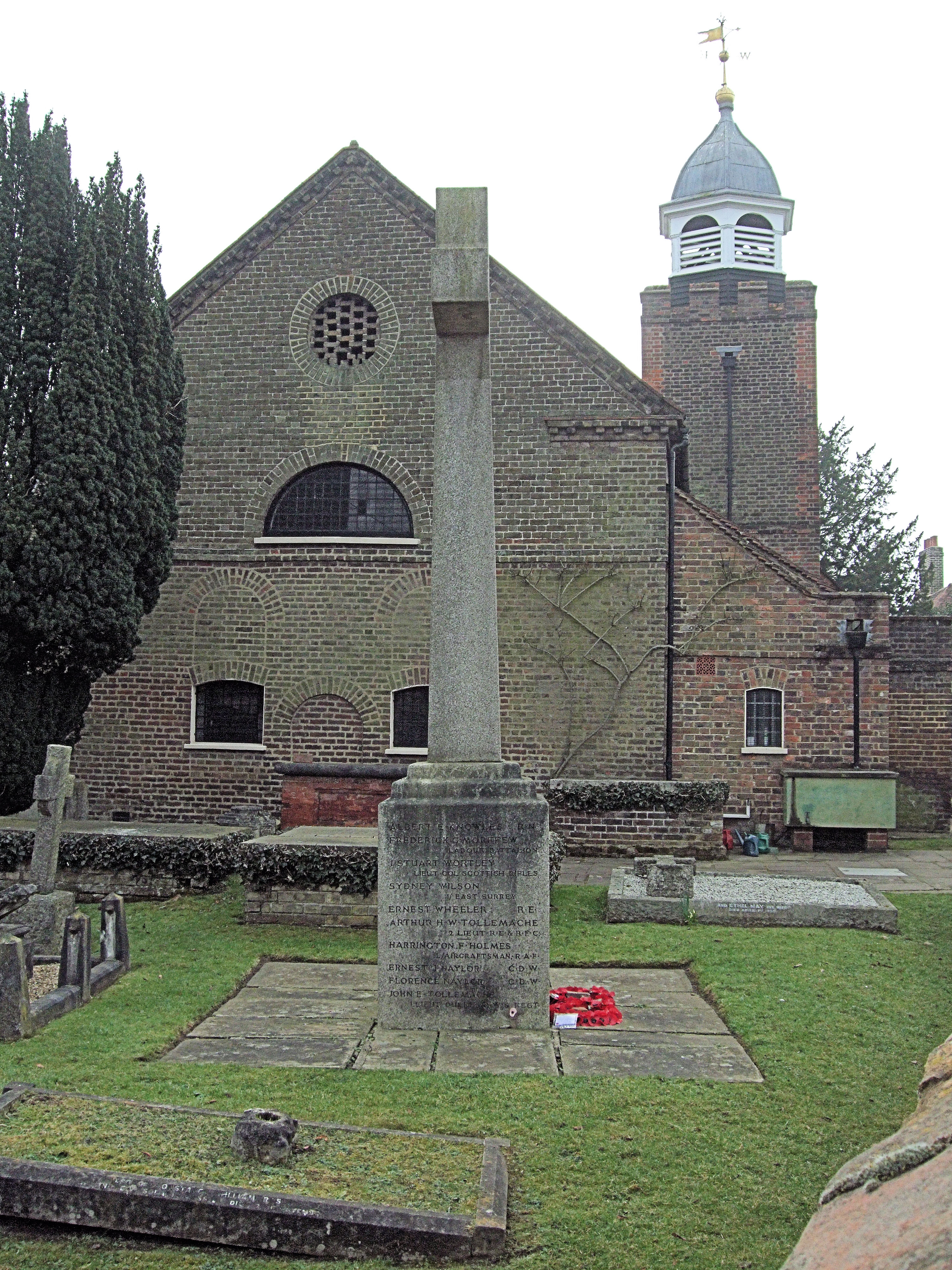
War memorial

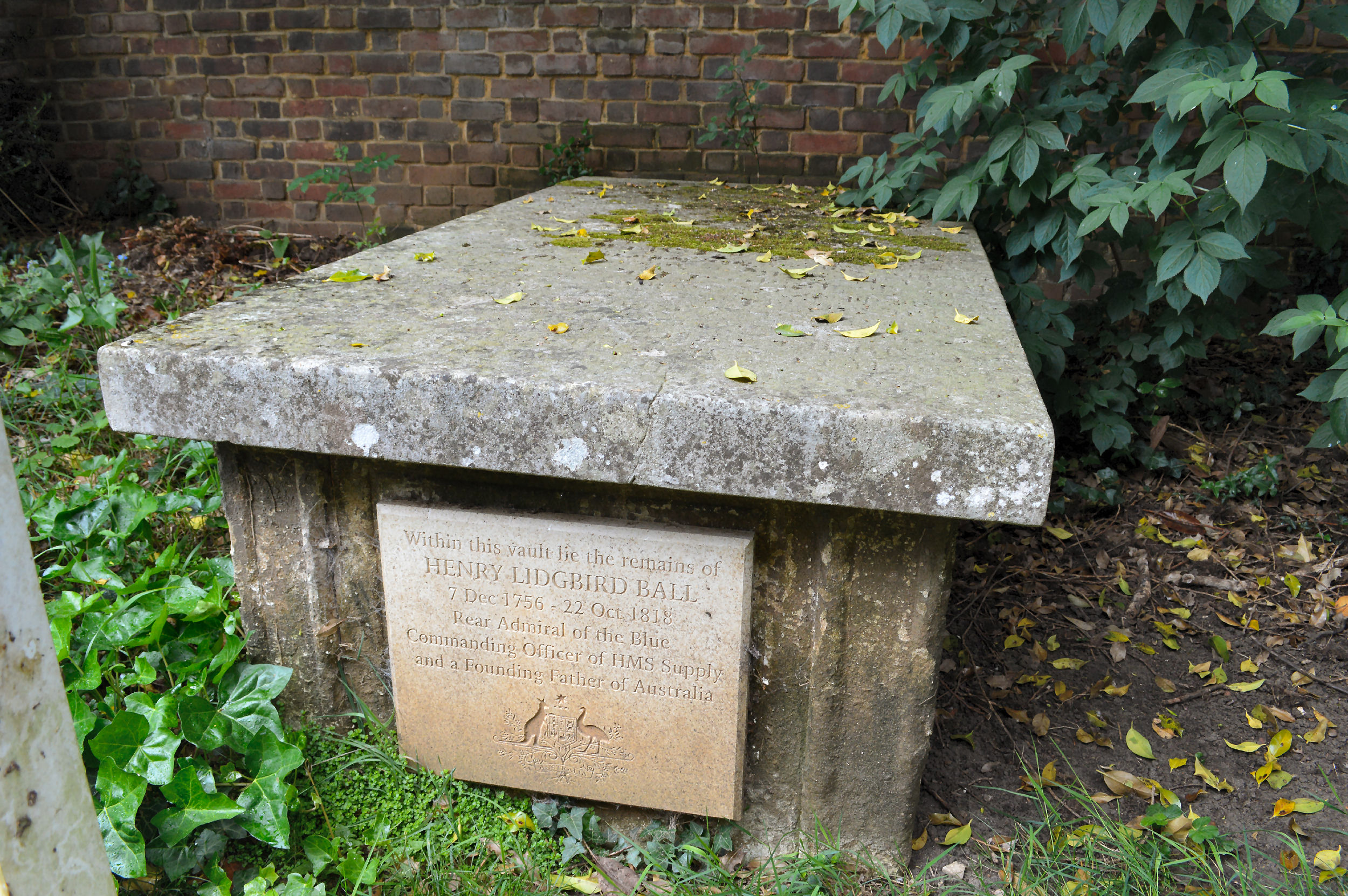
A 21st-century plaque commemorates Henry Lidgbird Ball's burial in the family vault of his wife Anne Georgianna Henrietta Johnston

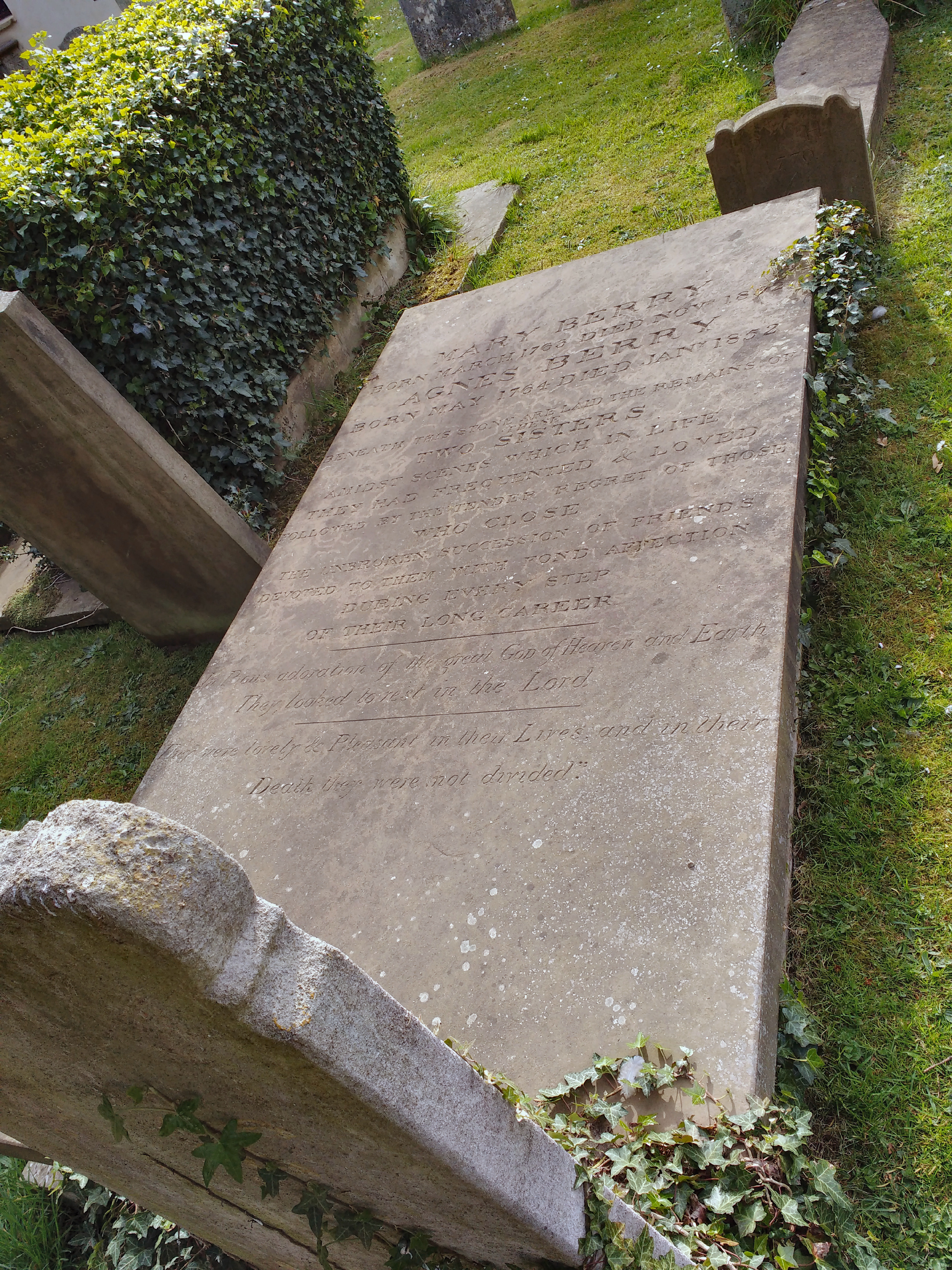
Grave of Mary and Agnes Berry

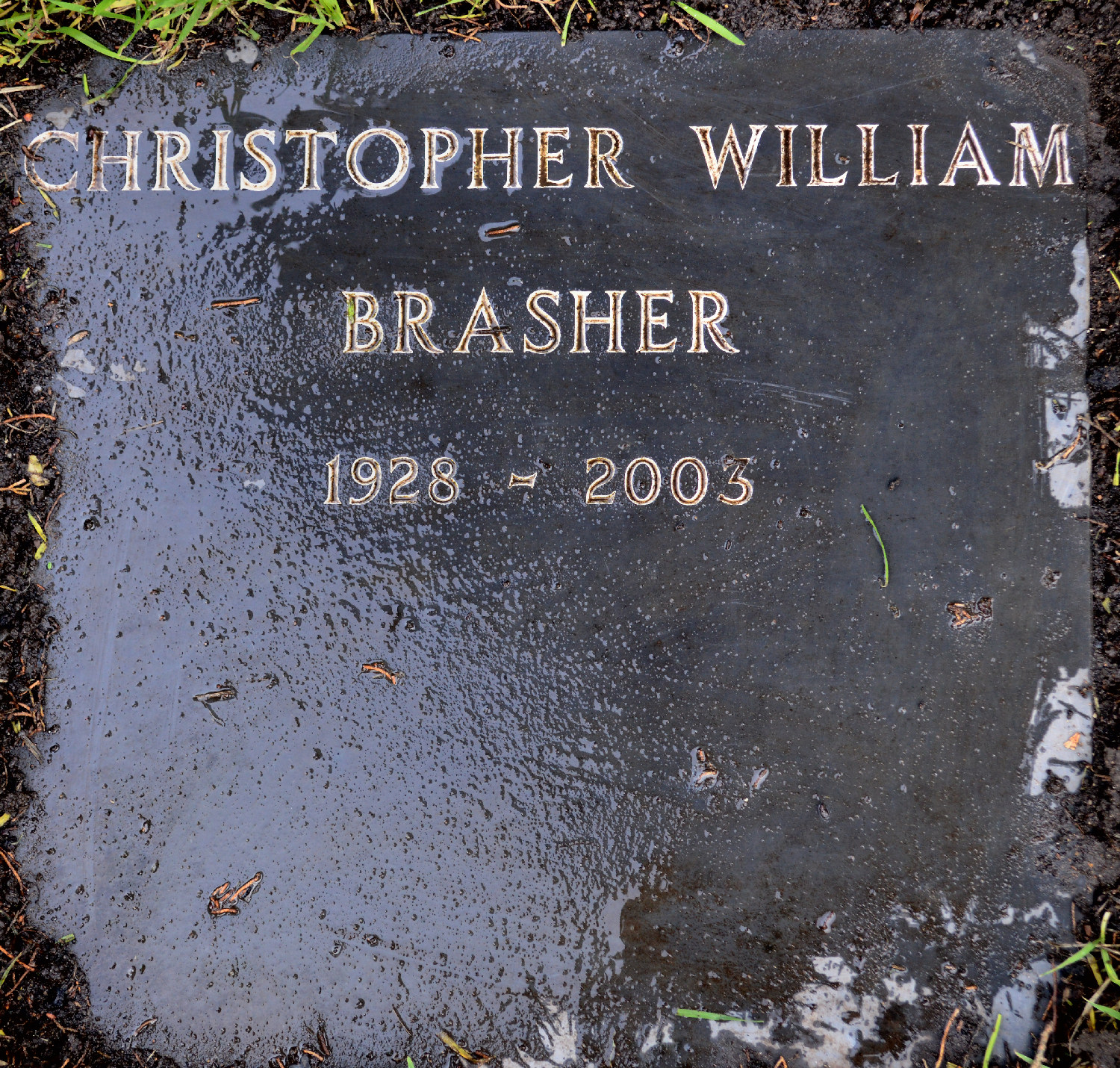
Grave of Chris Brasher

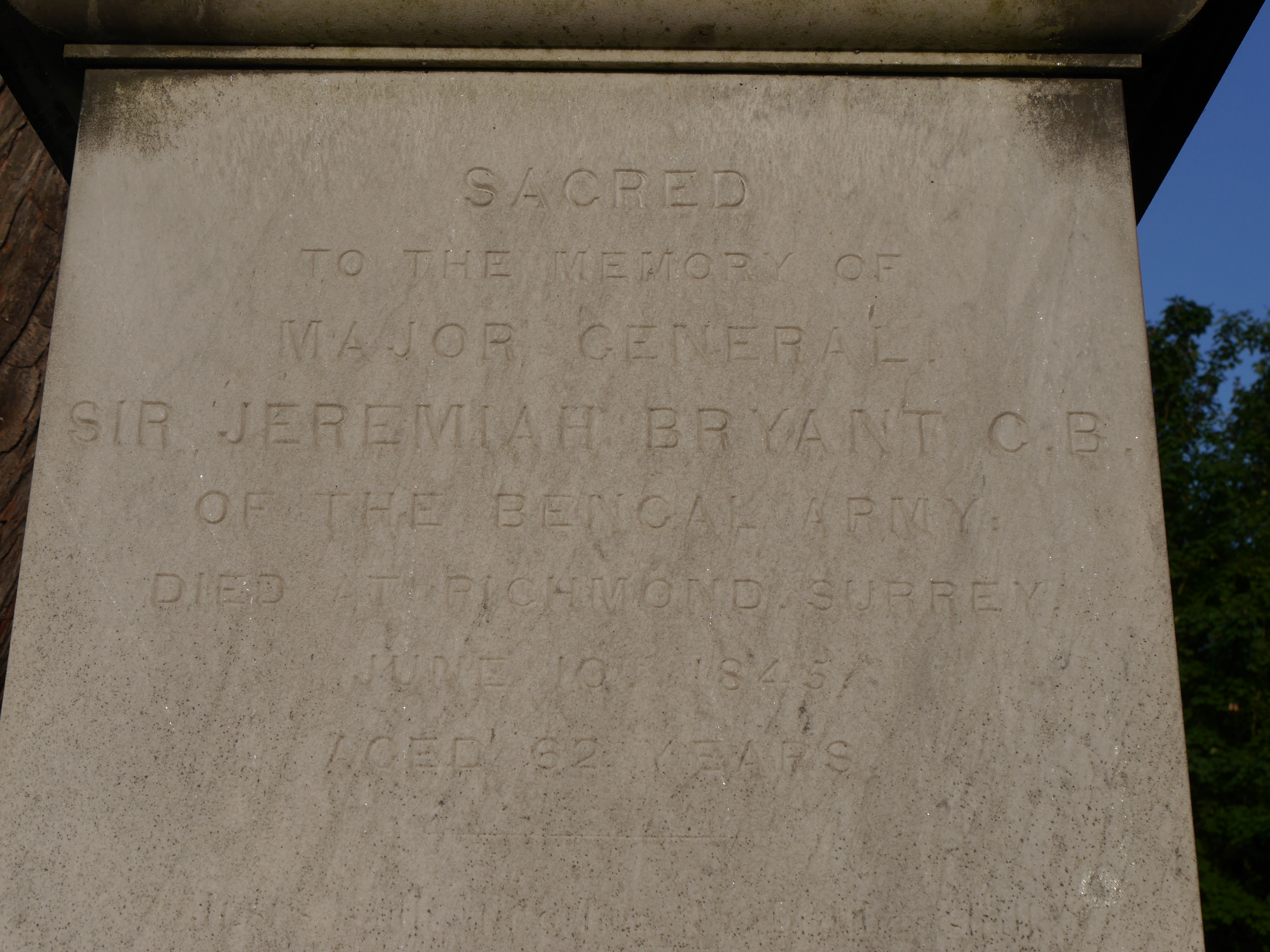
Jeremiah Bryant funerary monument

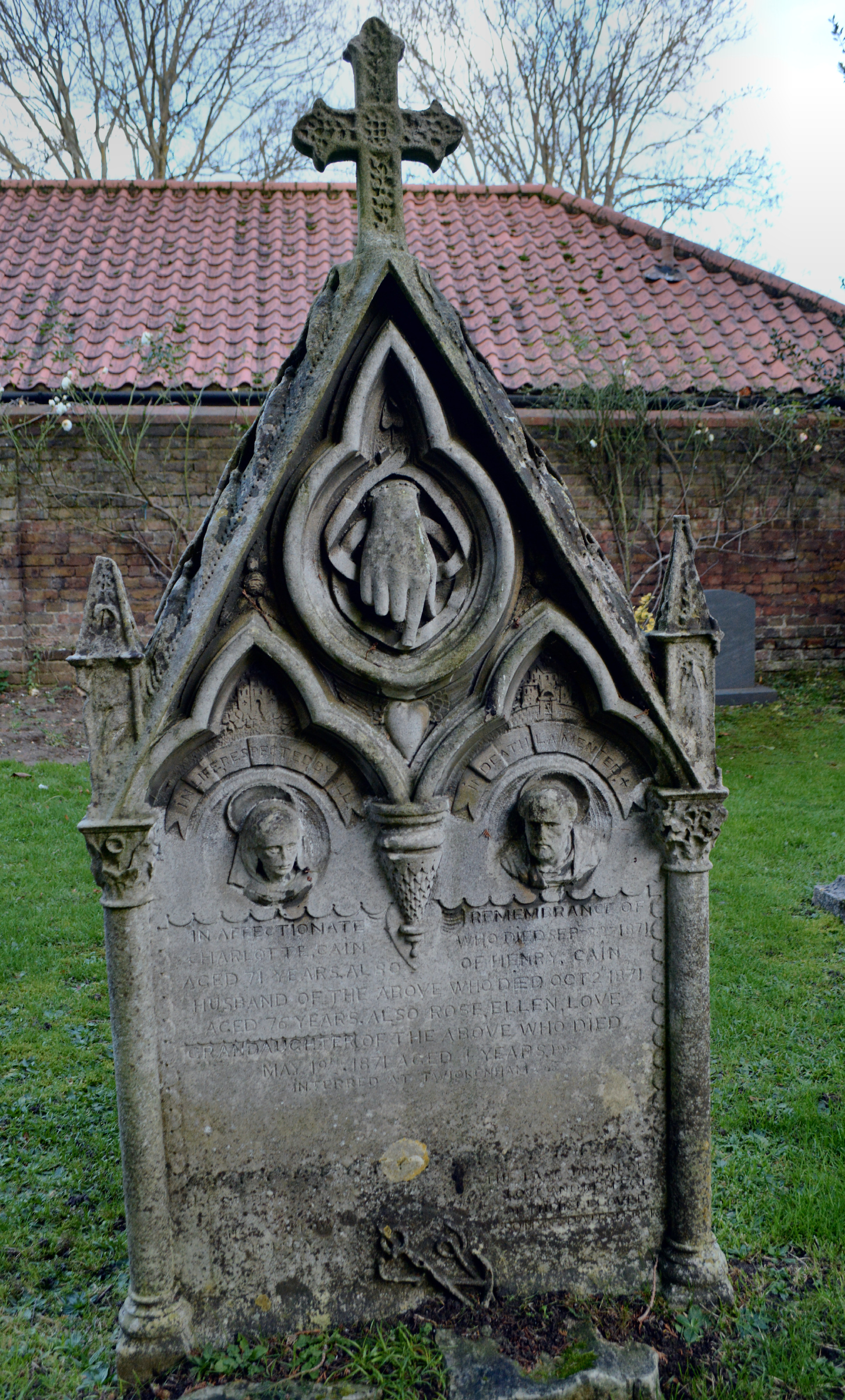
Gothic Revival headstone of Henry and Charlotte Cain (1871)

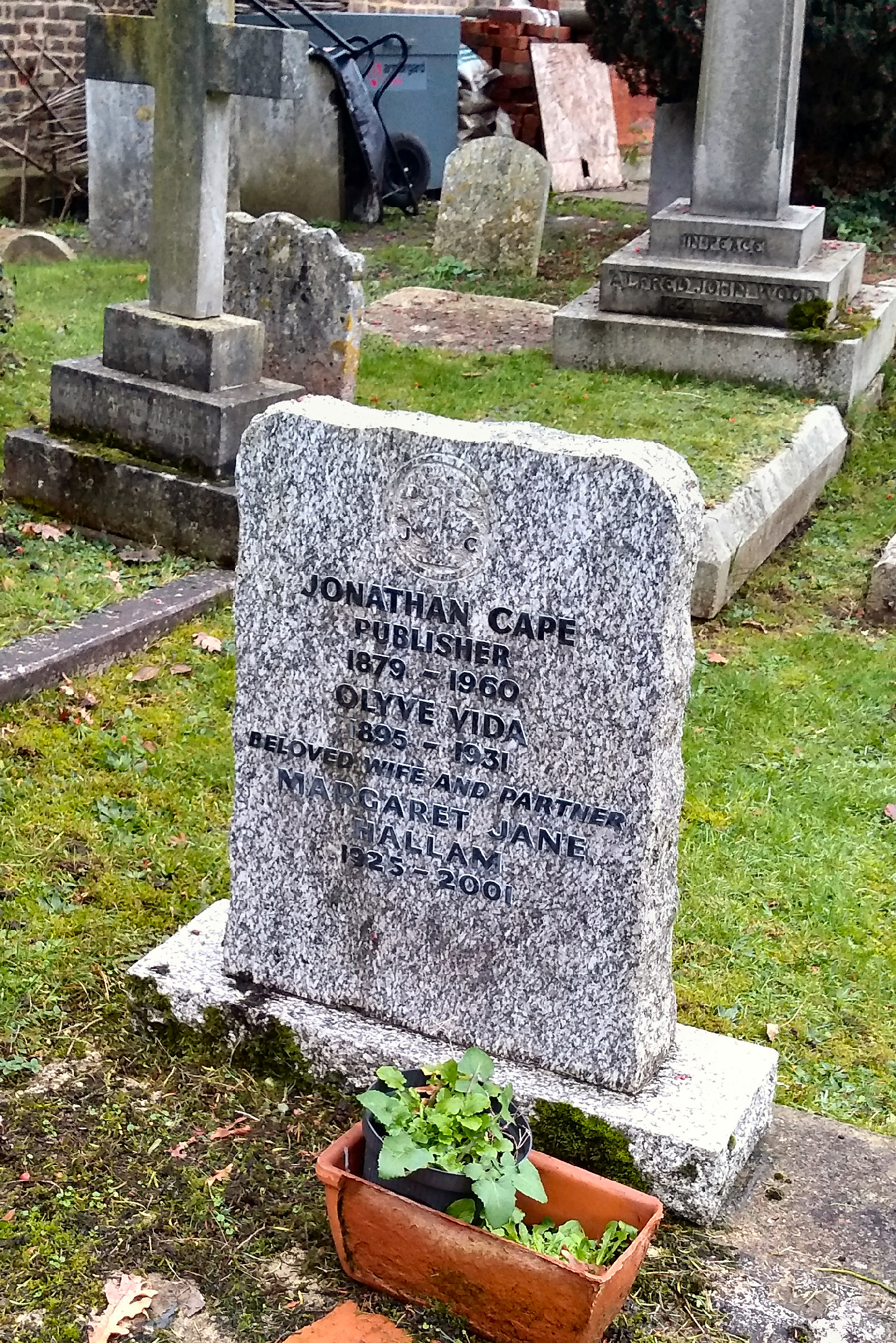
Grave of publisher Jonathan Cape

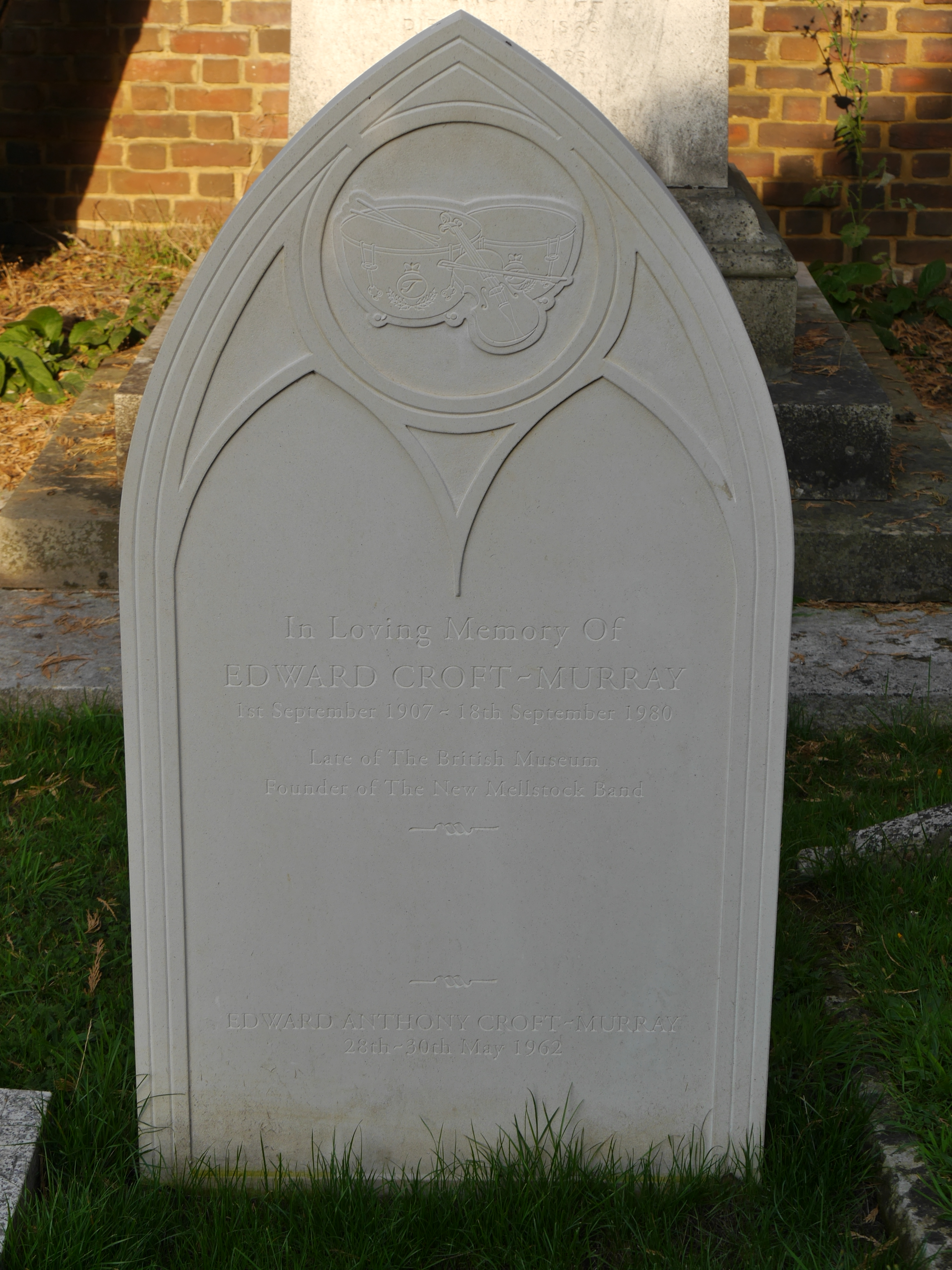
Grave of Edward Croft-Murray

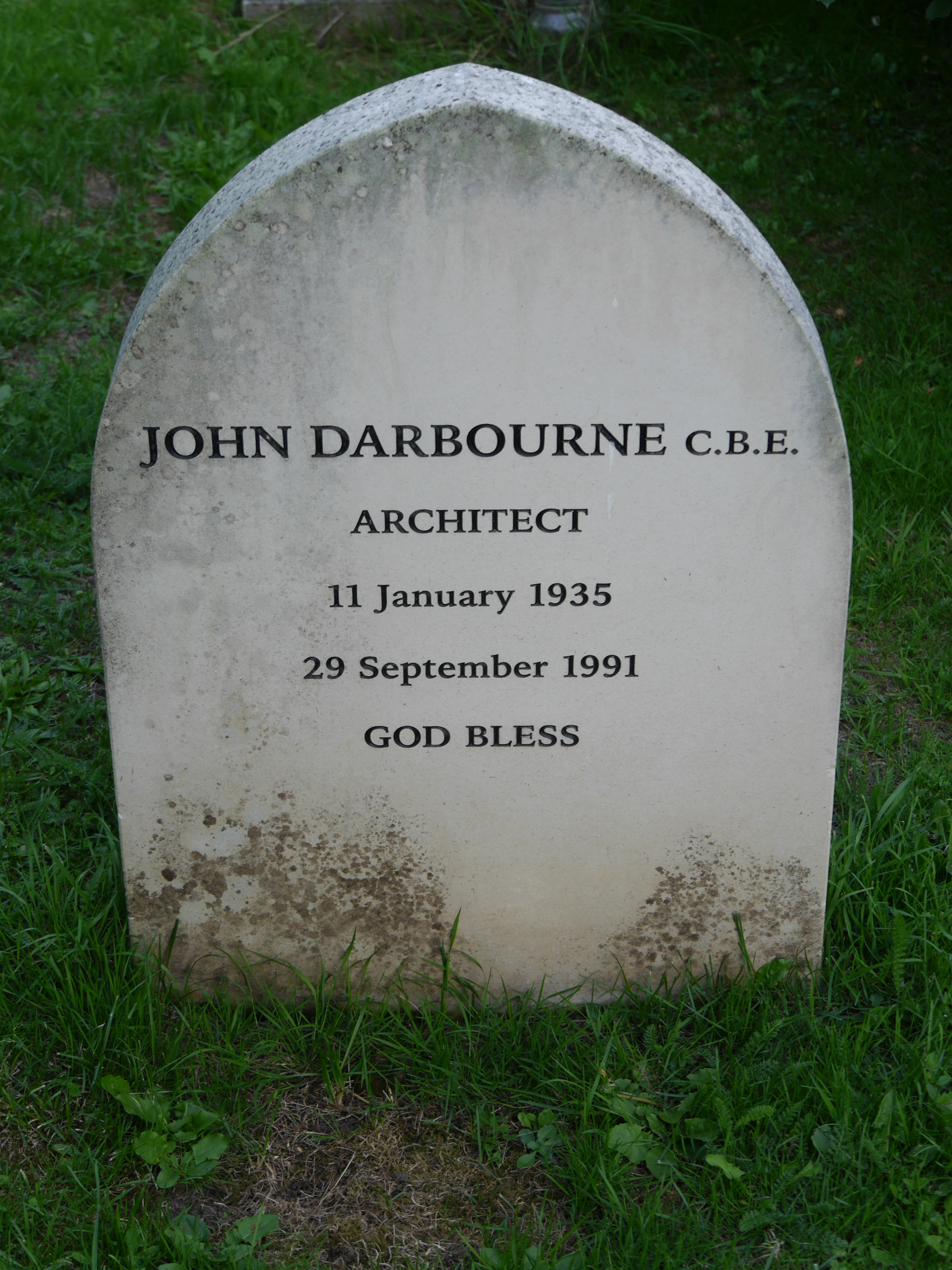
Grave of John Darbourne

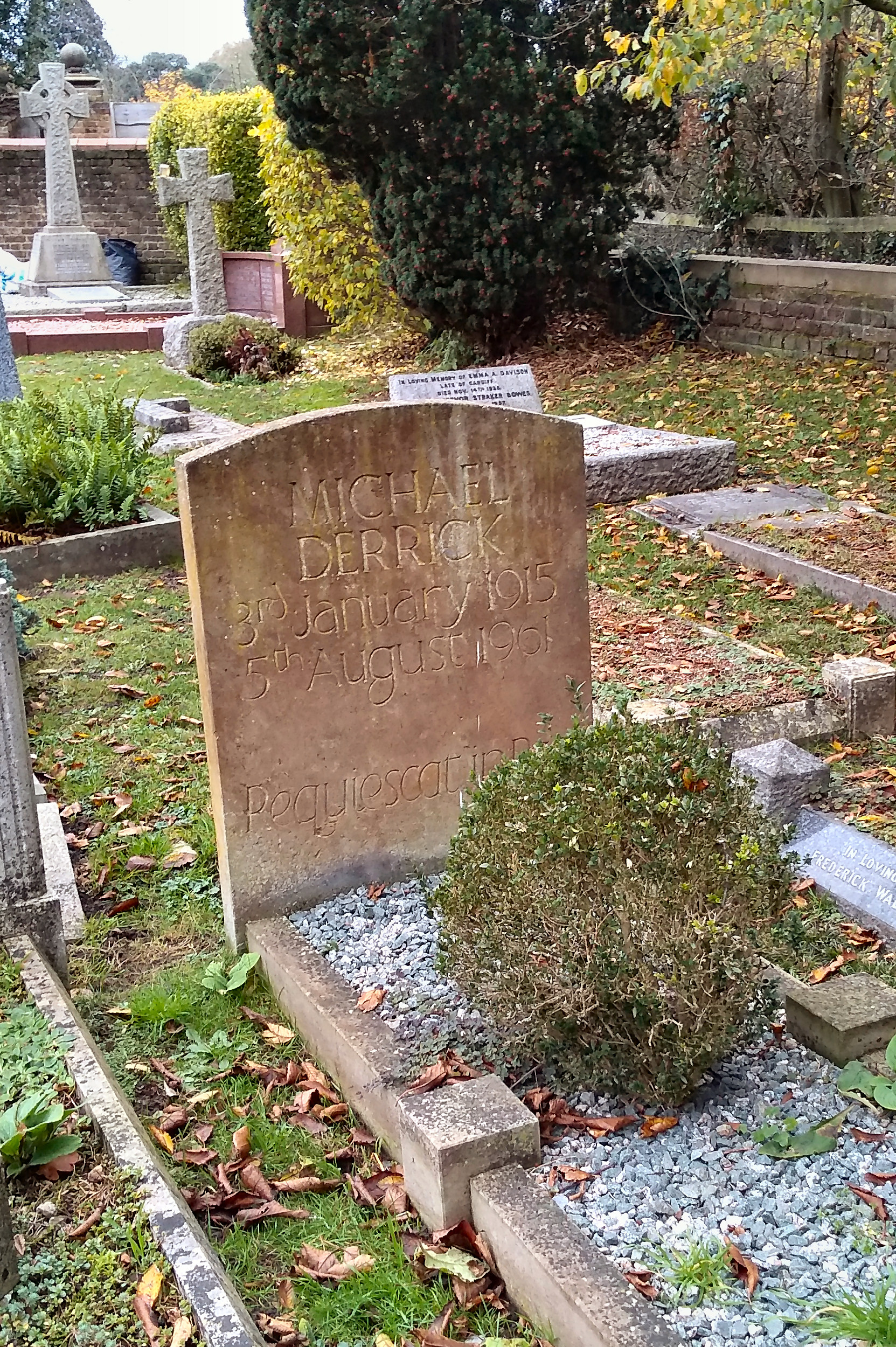
Grave of Michael Derrick

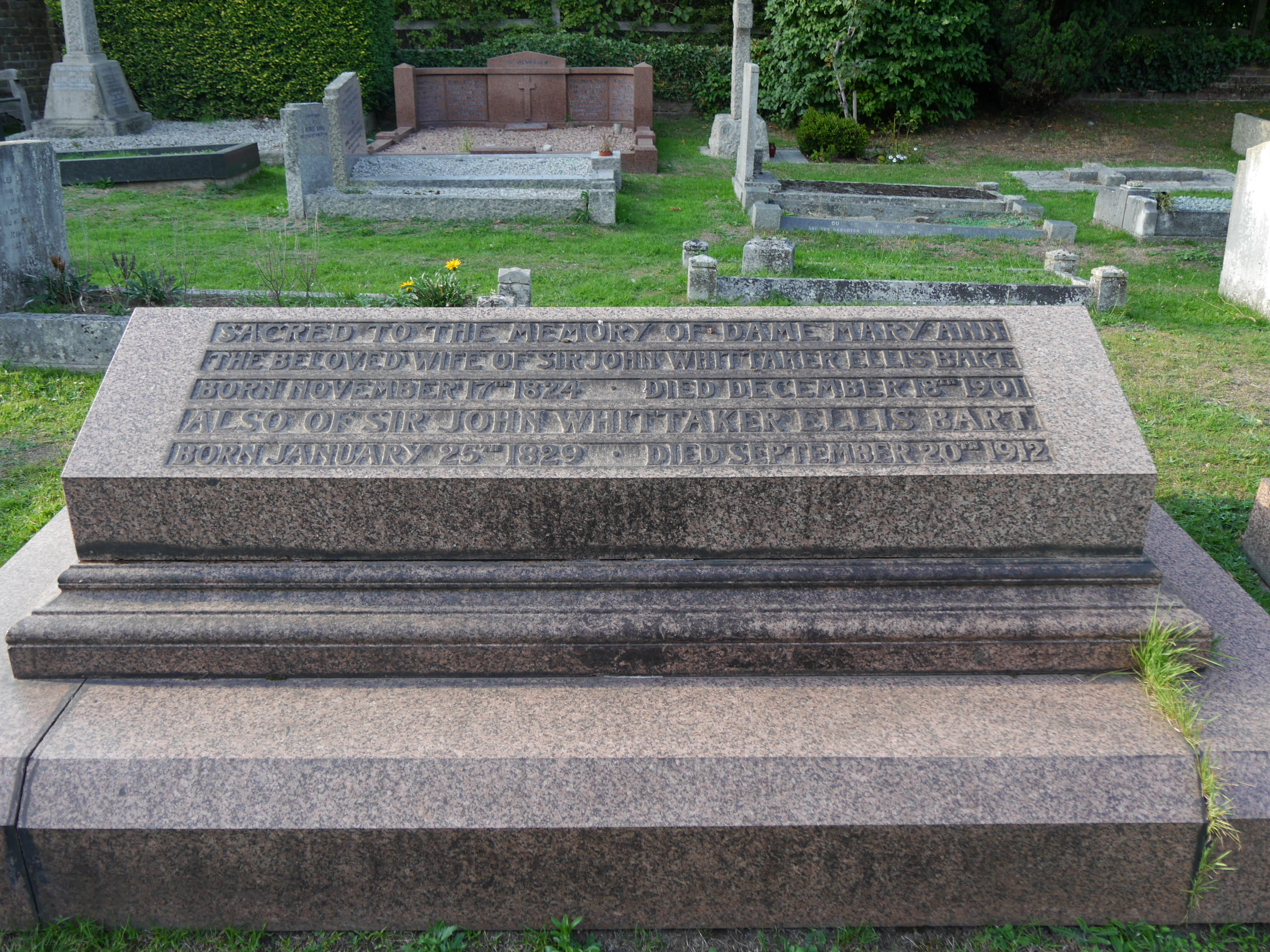
Family tomb of Sir John Whittaker Ellis

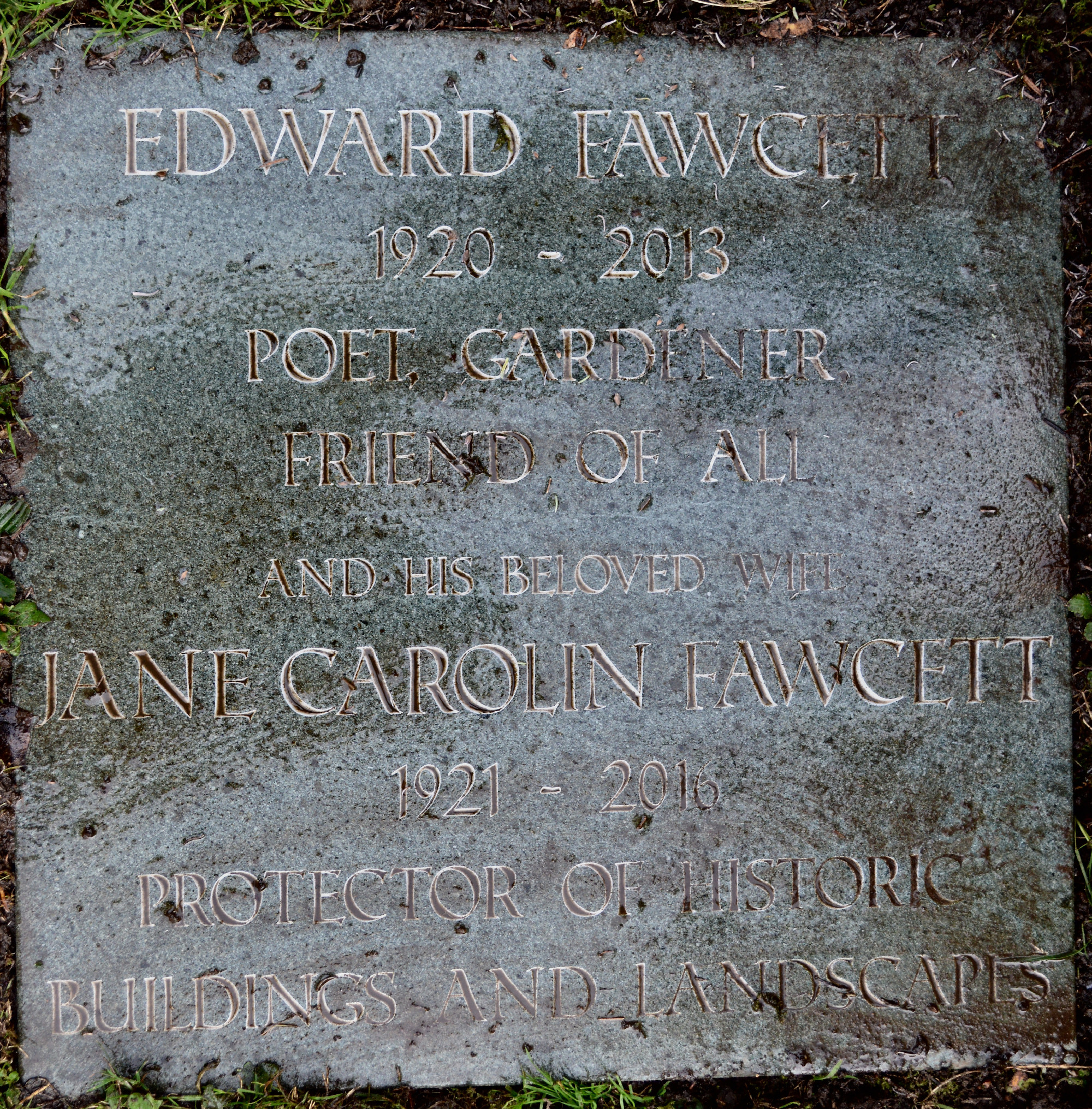
Memorial to Edward and Jane Fawcett

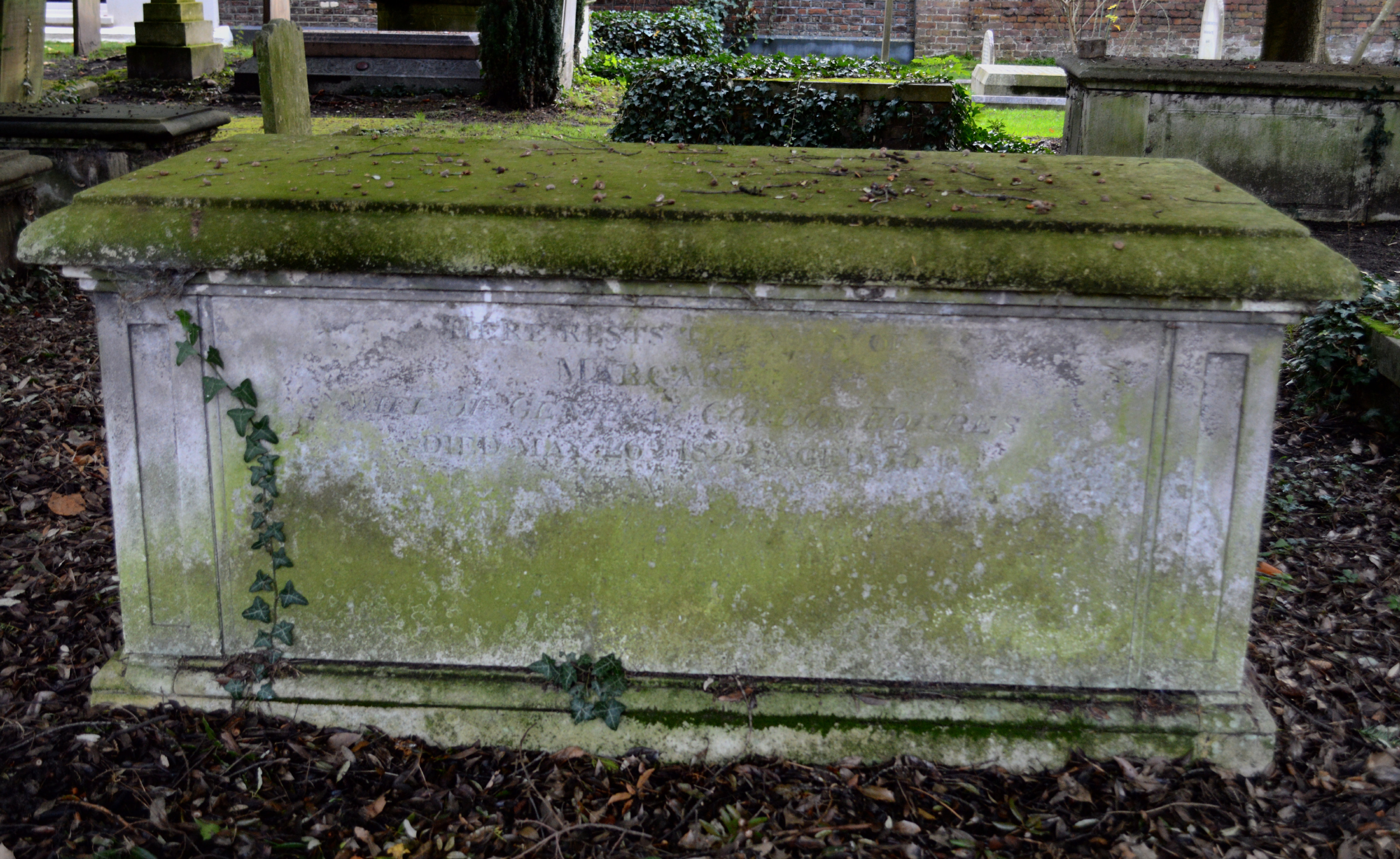
Tomb of Army General Gordon Forbes

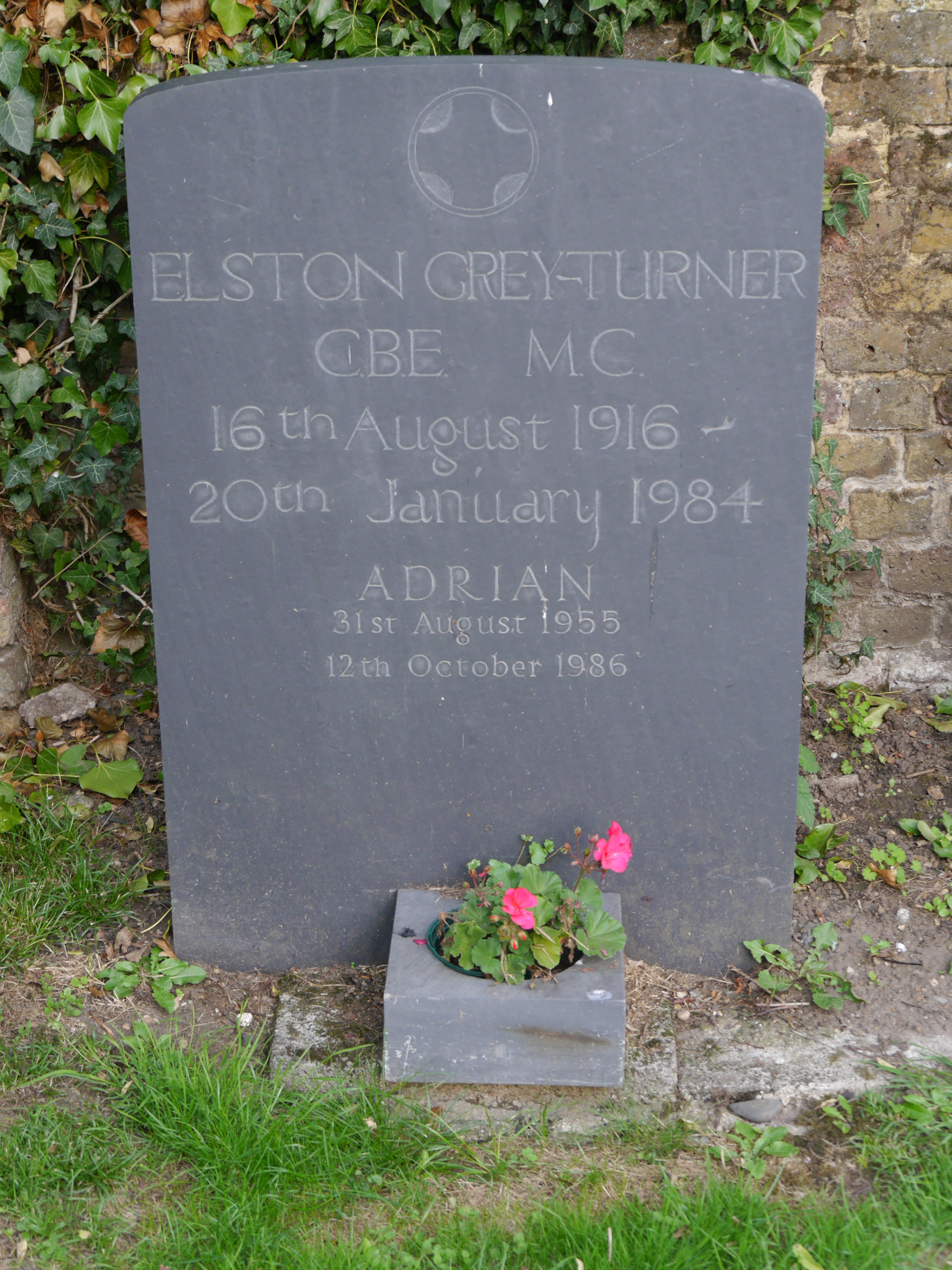
Grave of Elston Grey-Turner

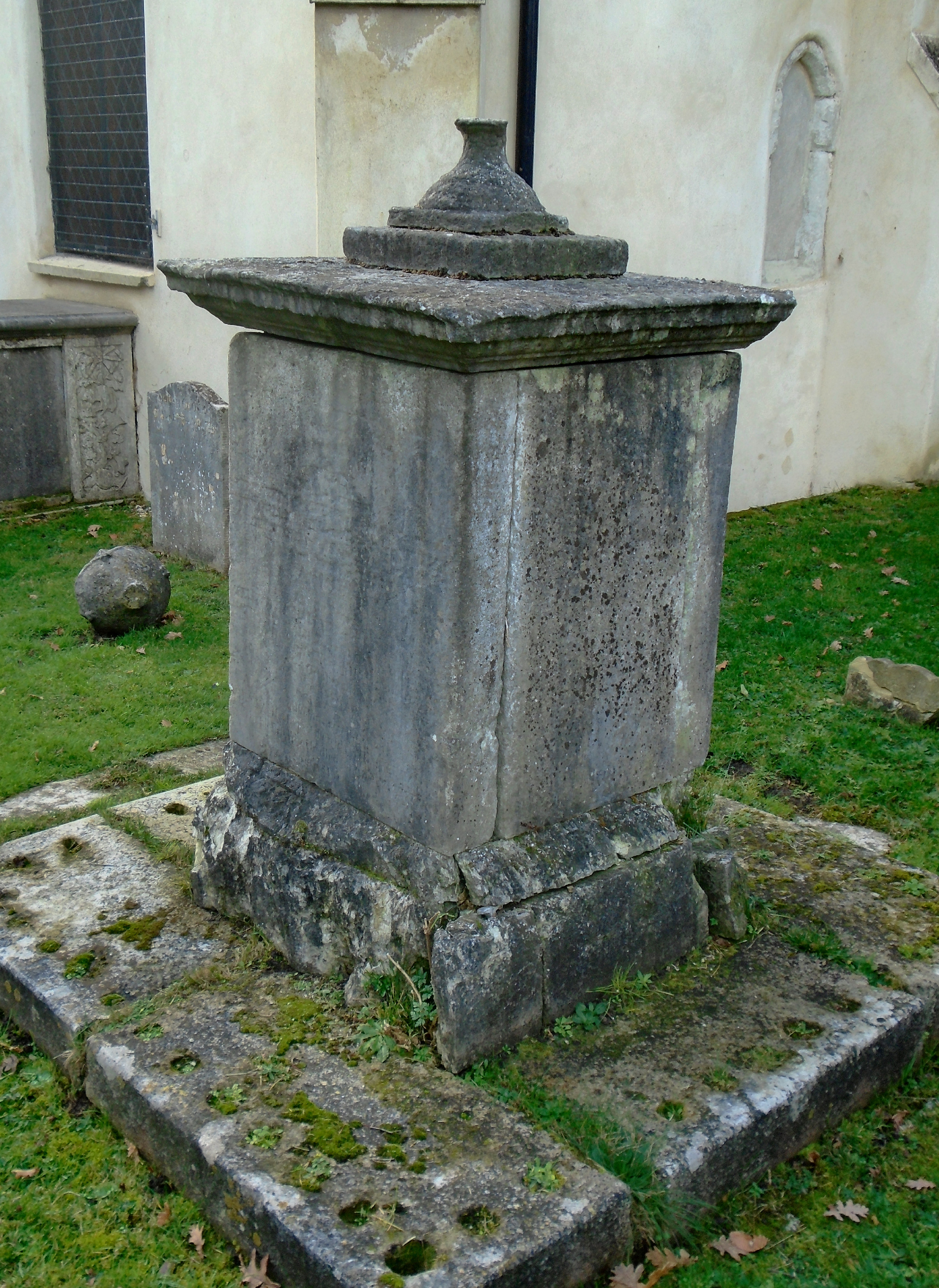
Halhead family tomb

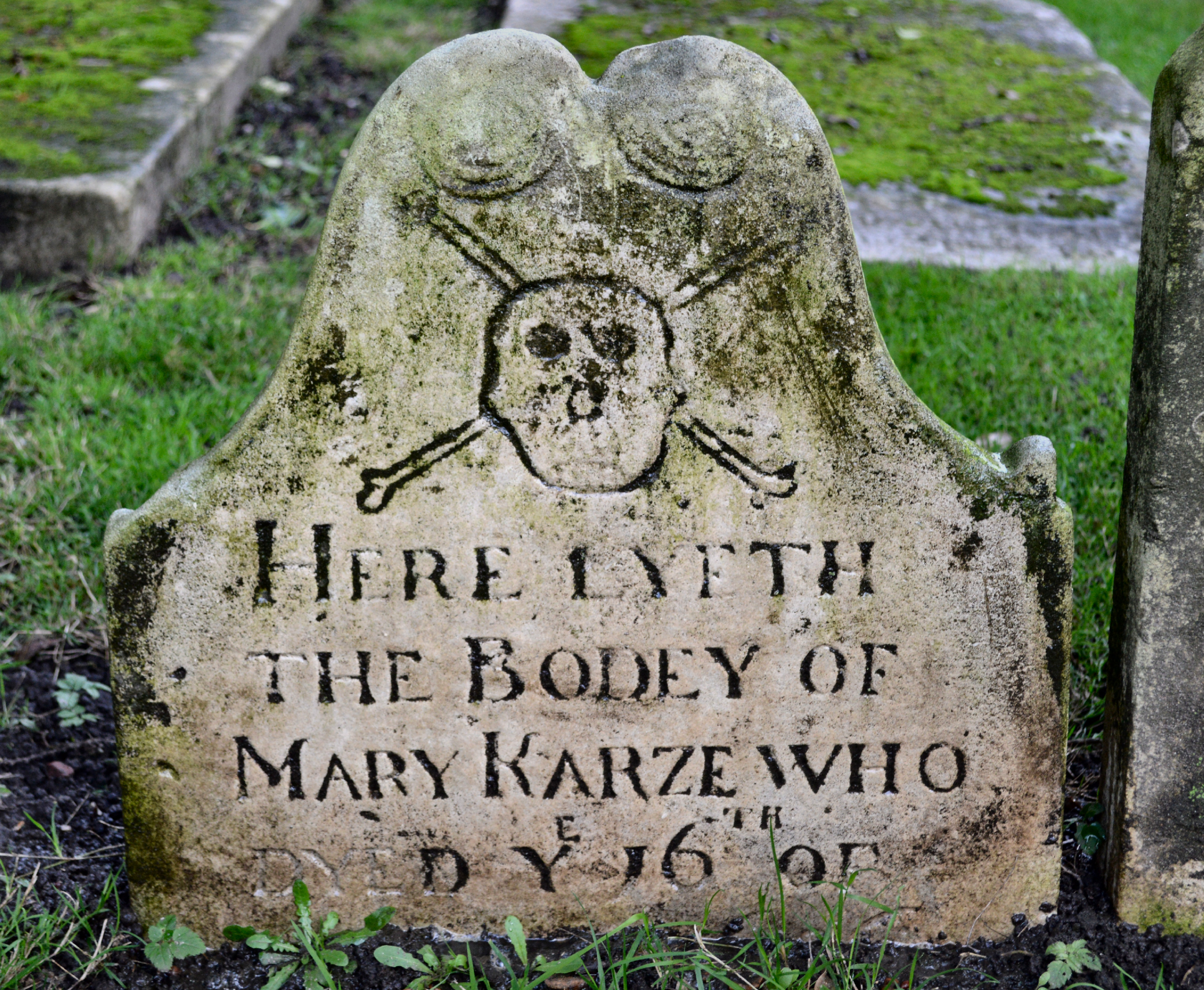
Mary Karze "who dyed ye 16th of April 1686"

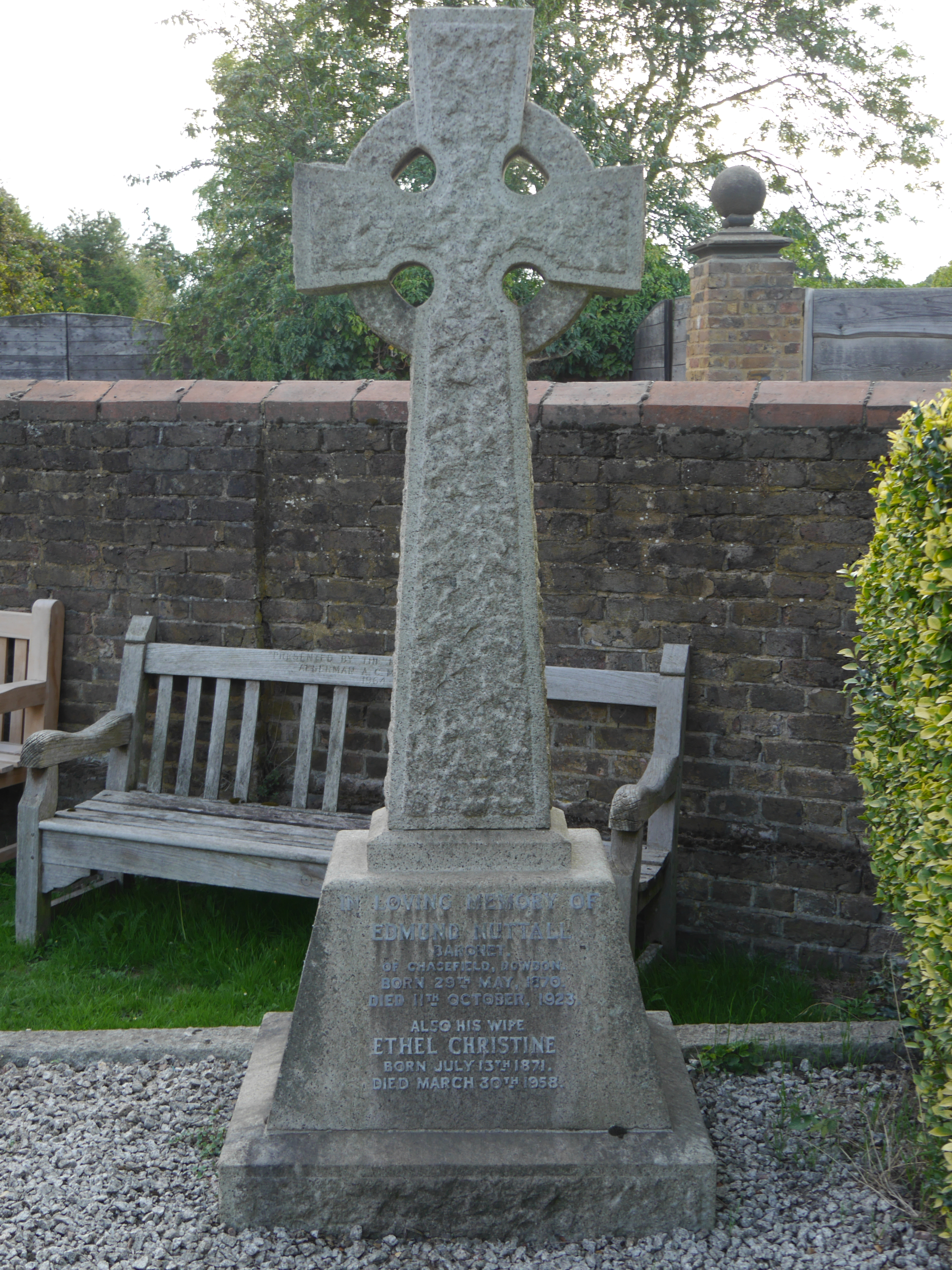
Monument for Sir Edmund Nuttall and his wife Christine

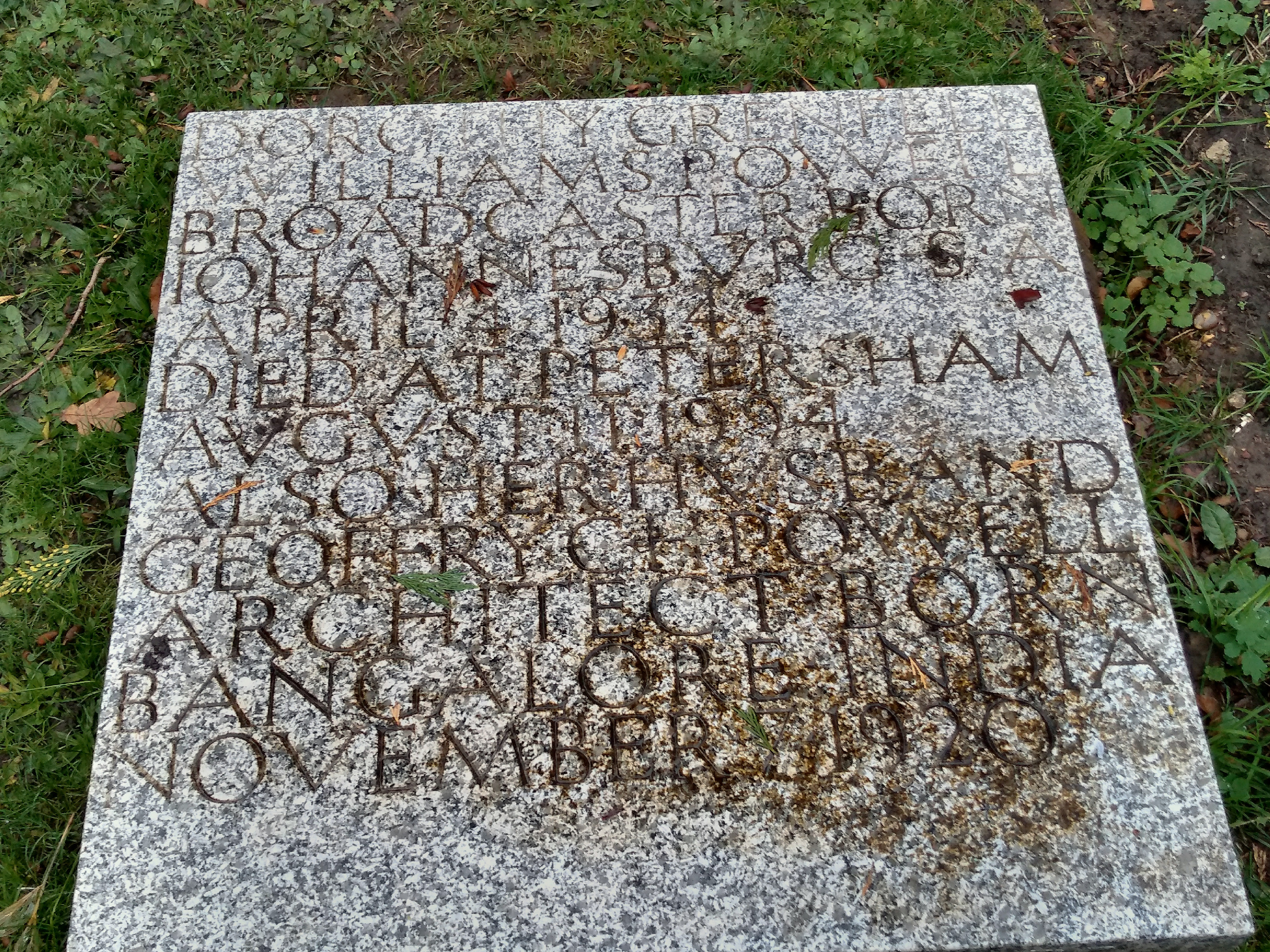
Grave of Dorothy Grenfell Williams Powell, radio producer and broadcaster, and her husband Geoffry Powell, architect with Chamberlin, Powell and Bon

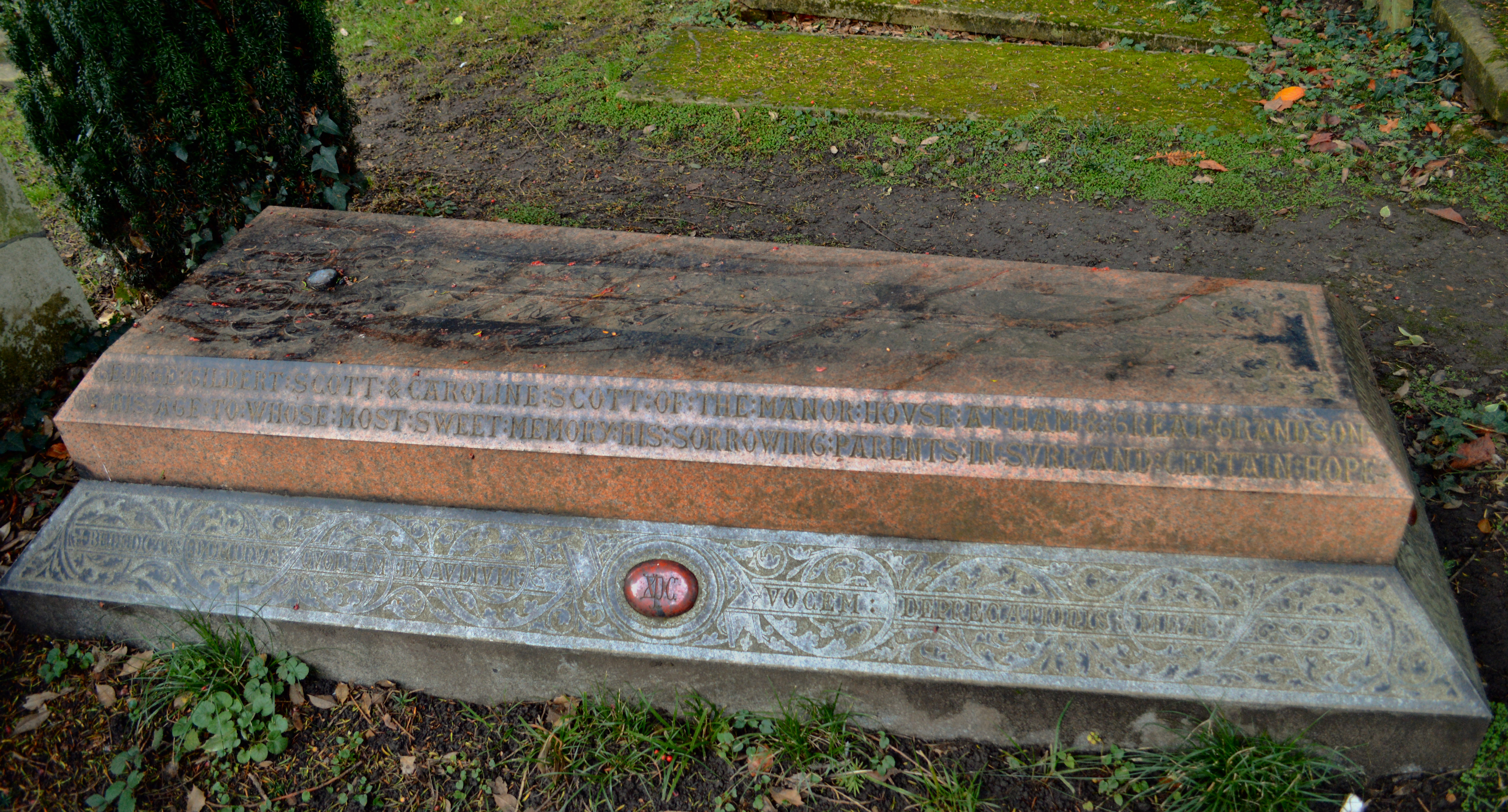
Tomb of Albert Henry Scott by Sir George Gilbert Scott

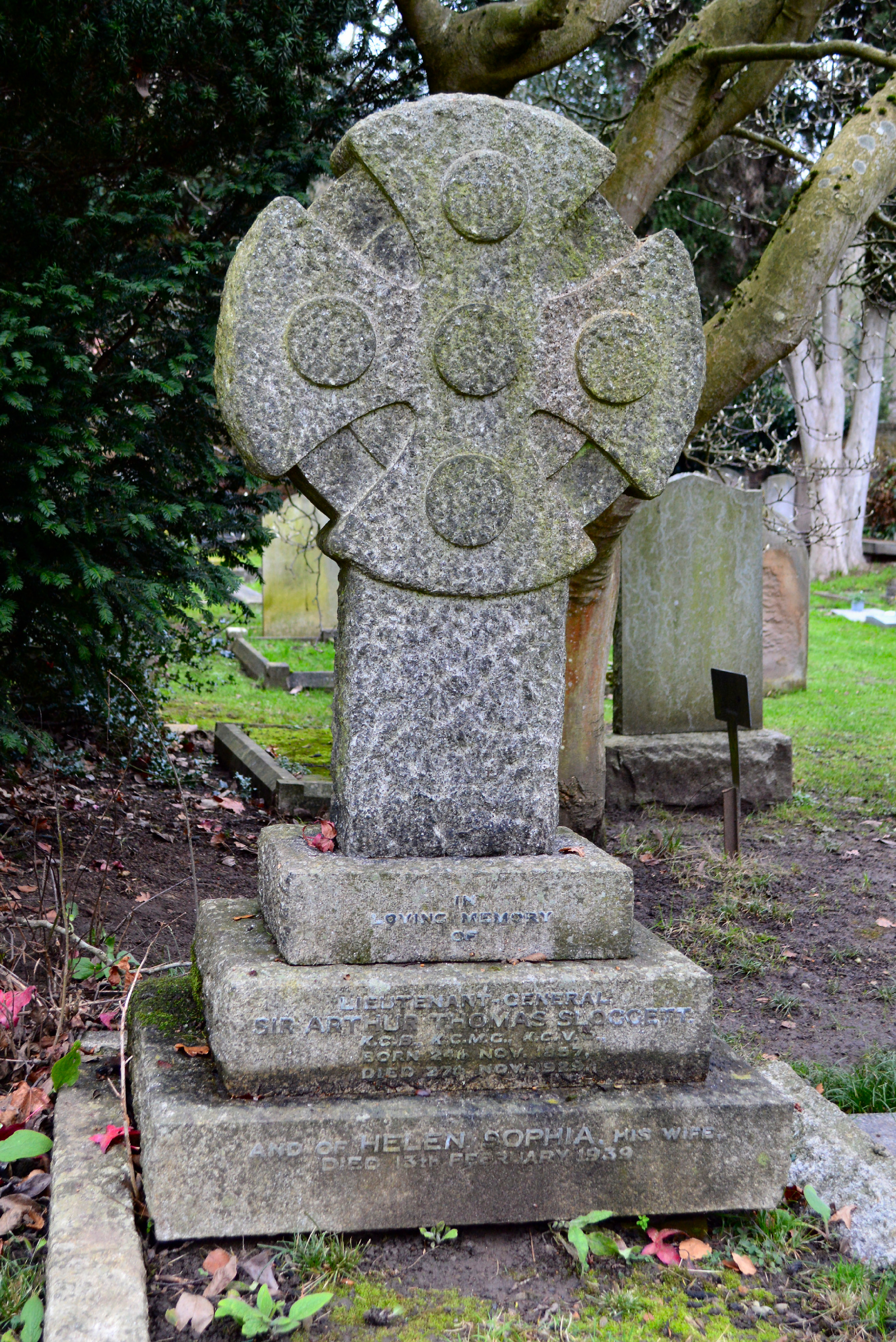
Sir Arthur Sloggett headstone

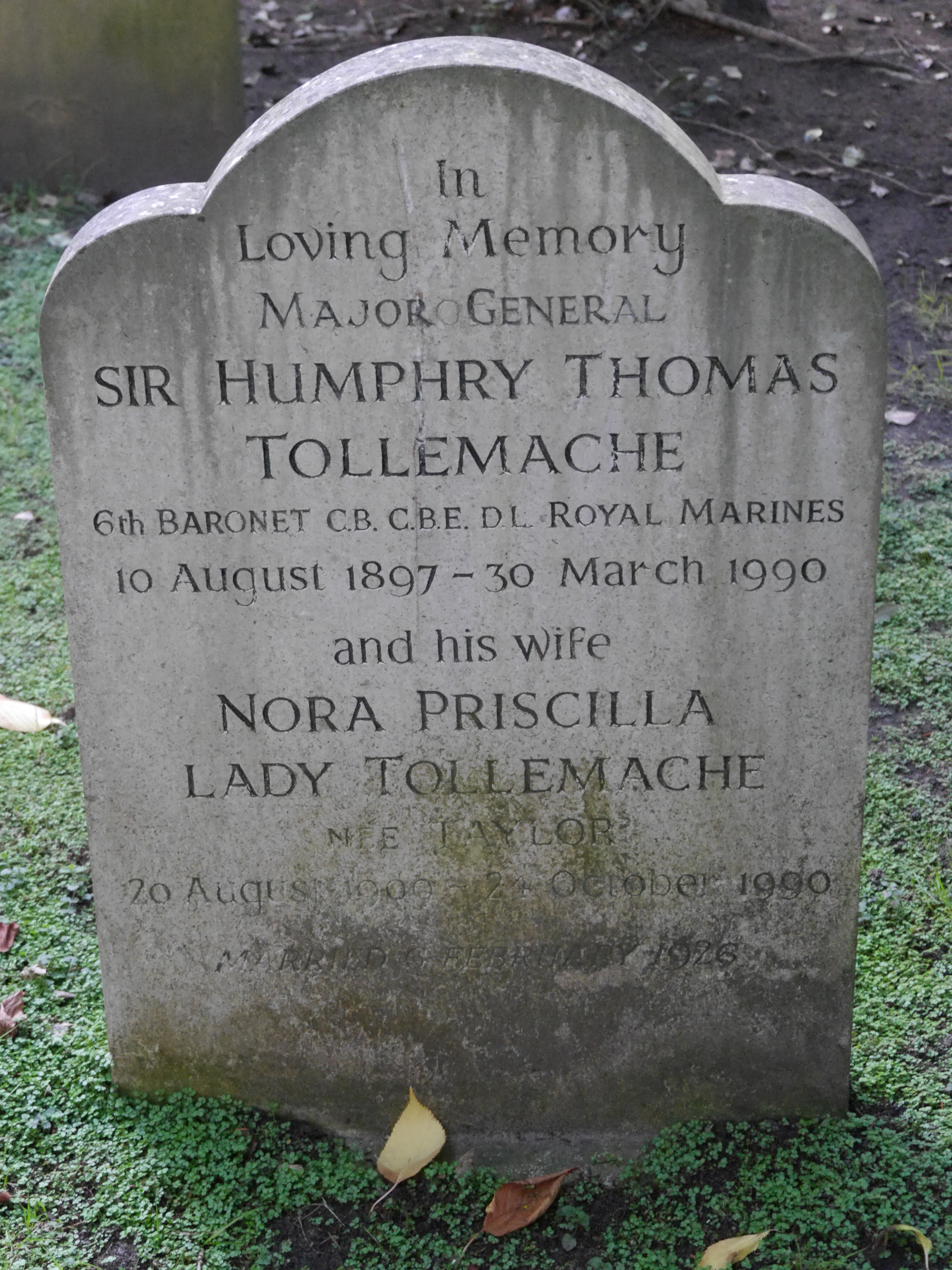
Grave of Sir Humphry Tollemache and his wife, Nora Priscilla, Lady Tollemache

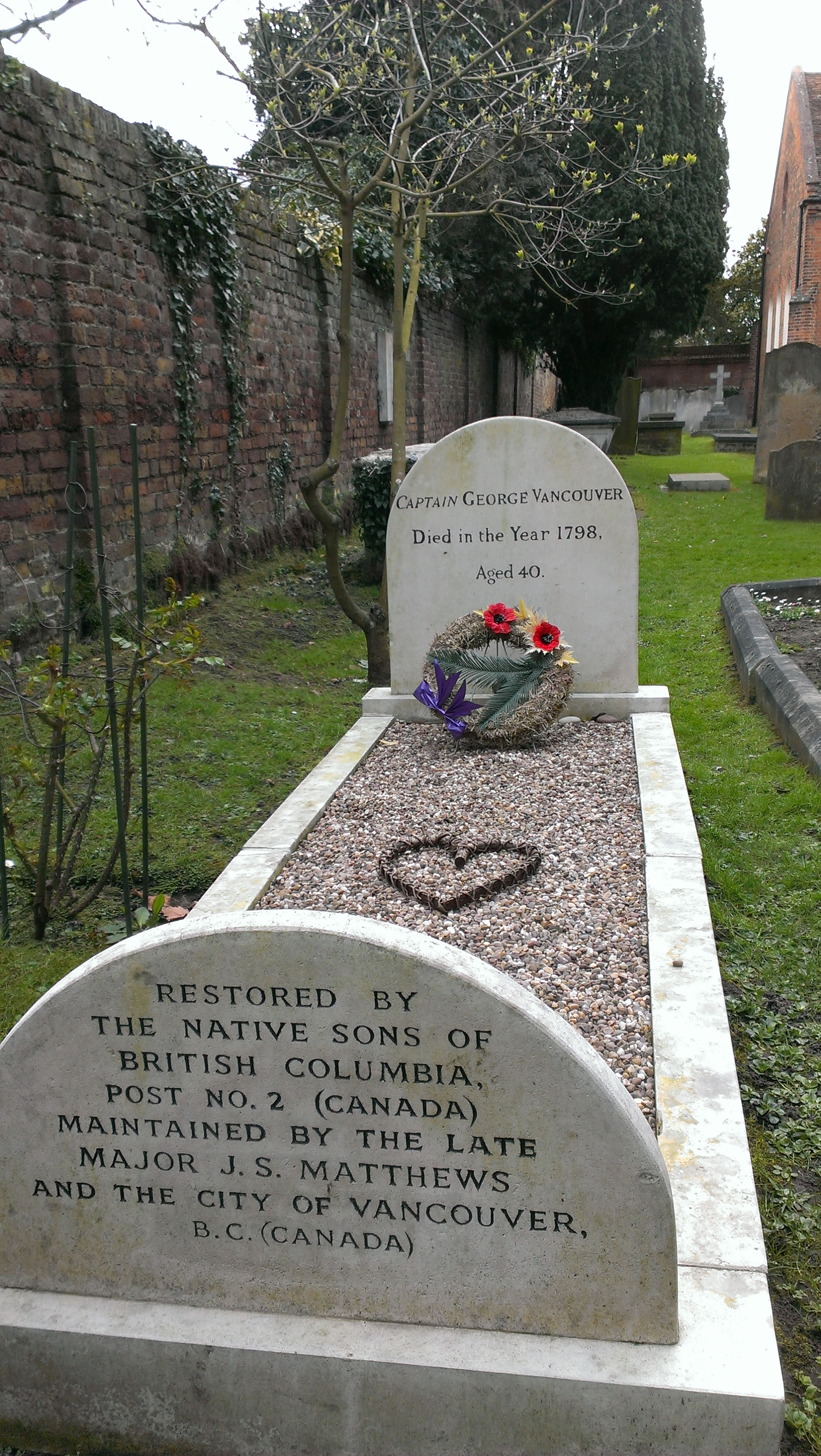
Grave of George Vancouver

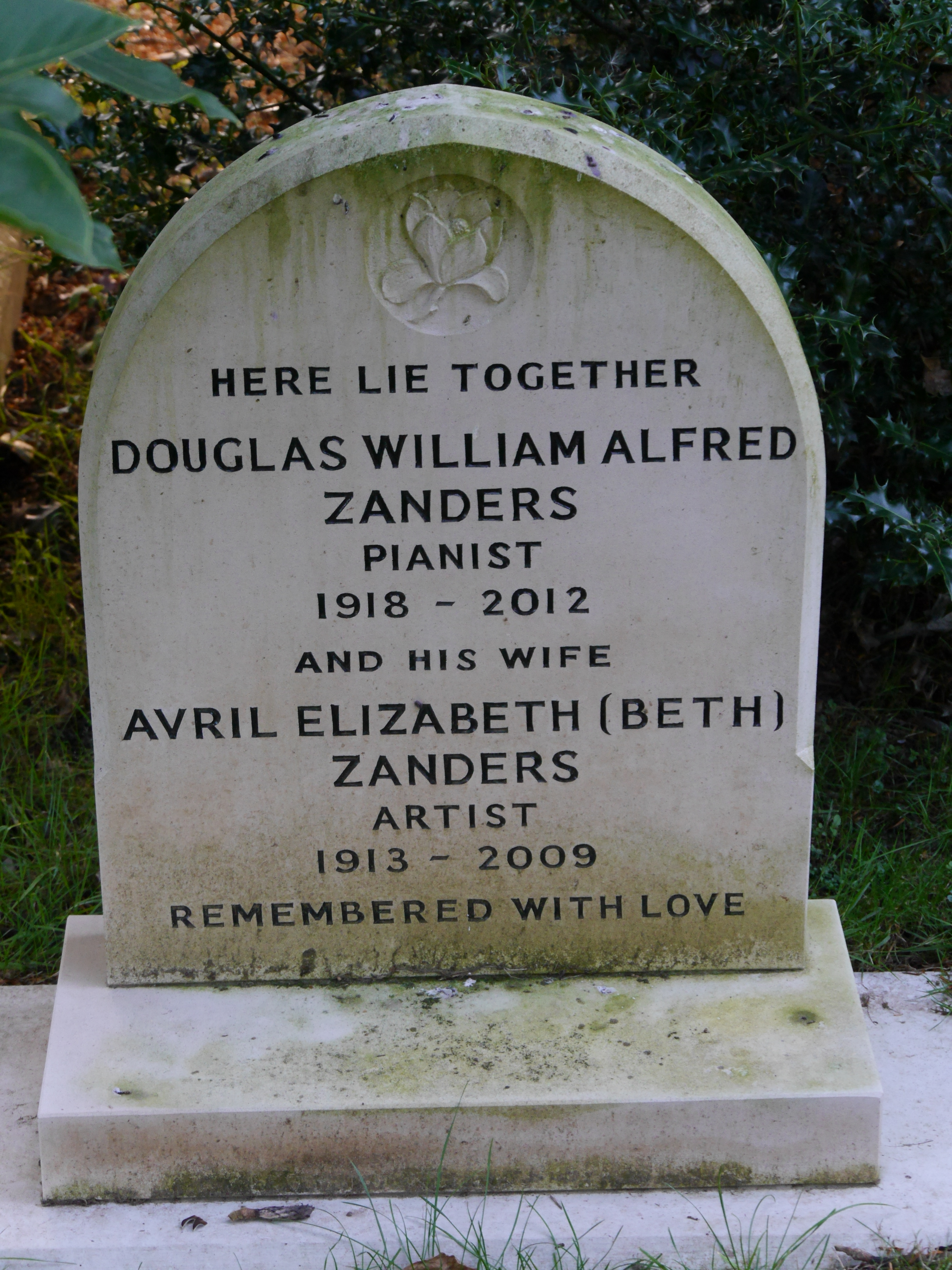
Grave of artist Beth Zanders and her husband, pianist Douglas Zanders

== See also ==
- All Saints' Church, Petersham
