= Margaret Katherine Black =

Food historian and author (1921–1999)

Margaret Katherine "Maggie" Black (22 September 1921, in Fulham, West London – 5 August 1999, in Wandsworth, South London) was known as a food historian, a leading food writer, and an author of many children's books and plays.

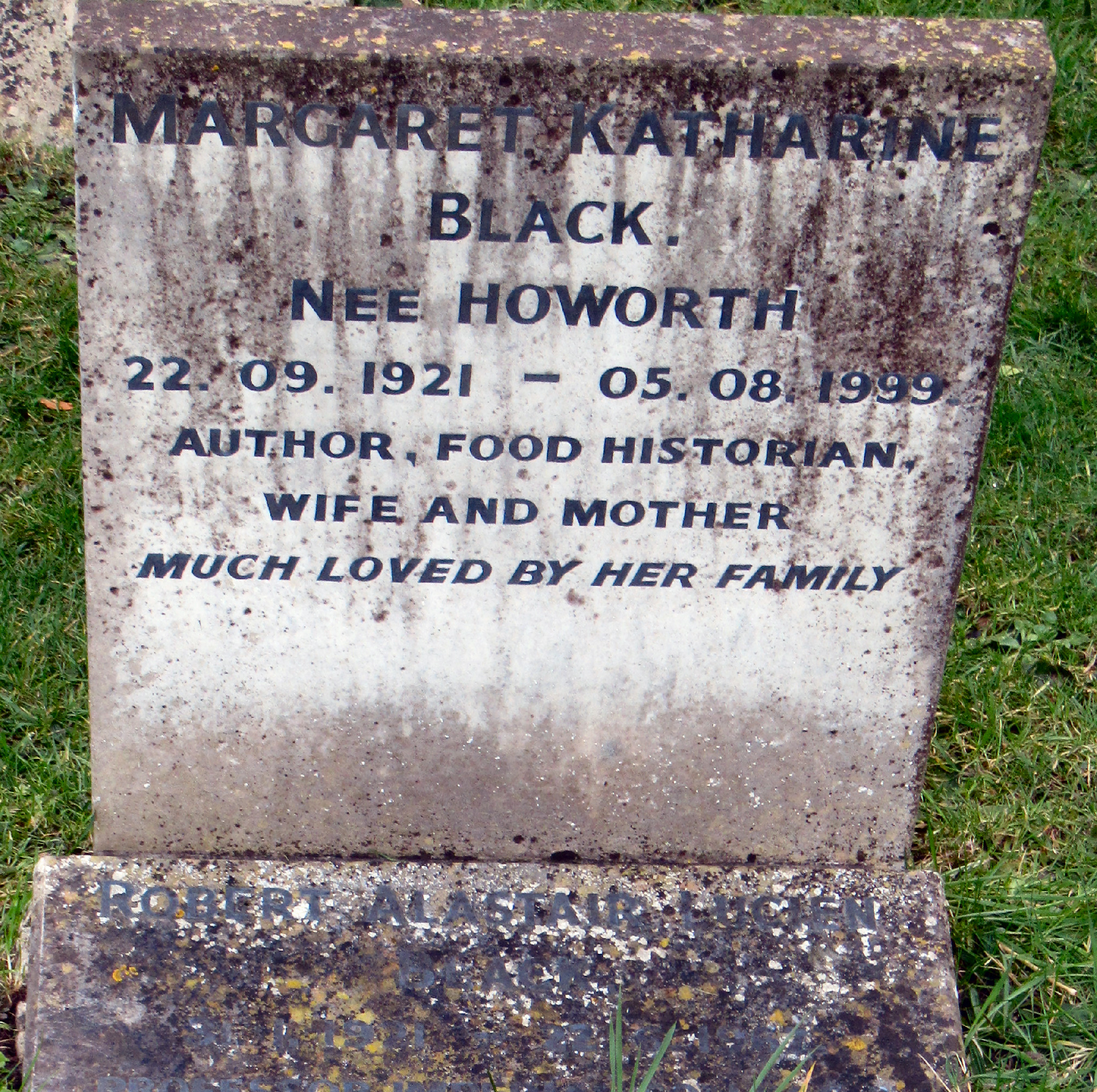
Headstone, St Peter's Church, Petersham

Born Margaret Katherine Howorth in 1943 she married Robert Alastair Black (1921 - 1967) in Surrey. After the Second World War they moved to South Africa where she took a master's degree at the University of the Witwatersrand in Johannesburg. They returned to England in 1963 where she published No Room for Tourists (1965), a semi-biographical account of life under apartheid.

In the following years she went on to study in Switzerland and America, writing books on food history and cook books.

== Selected books ==
- No Room for Tourists: A search for an answer to the tensions of Apartheid. (1965). Margaret Black. London, Secker and Warburg.
- Mrs Beeton's Favourite Cakes and Breads. (1972). Mrs. Beeton. Edited By Maggie Black. London, Ward Lock.
- Heritage of British Cooking. (1977) Maggie Black. Littlehampton Book Services.
- The Wholesome Food Cookbook. (1982). Maggie Black. David & Charles.
- Food and Cooking in Medieval Britain (Food and Cooking in Britain). (1985). Peter Brears and Maggie Black. English Heritage.
- The Jane Austen Cookbook. (1995, 2002). Maggie Black, Deirdre Le Faye. McClelland & Stewart.
- Food and Cooking in Nineteenth-Century Britain: History and Recipes (1996). Maggie Black. Historic England Publishing.
- The Medieval Cookbook. (1996, 2012). Maggie Black. British Museum Press.
- Medieval Cookery: Recipes and History. (2003). Maggie Black. Historic England Publishing.
