= George Grey Turner =

English surgeon

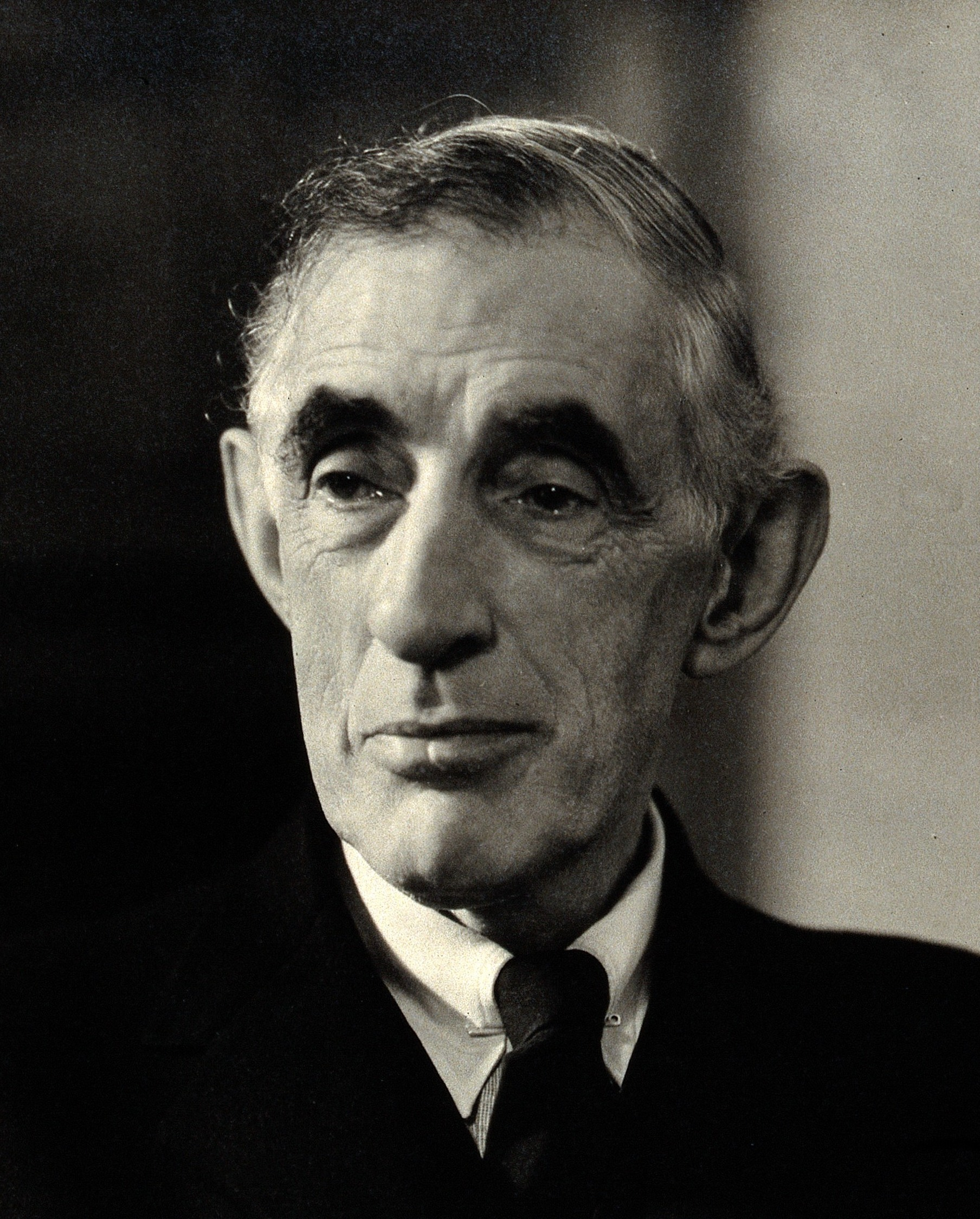
George Grey Turner in 1947

George Grey Turner (8 September 1877 – 24 August 1951) was an English surgeon.

He was born in North Shields and received his medical degree from Newcastle Medical School (then a part of the University of Durham). He received a Fellowship from the Royal College of Surgeons in 1903 and joined the staff of the Royal Infirmary. He served with the Royal Army Medical Corps in the First World War. As a young surgeon, he travelled around the world, being received by the Pope, Benito Mussolini, the King of Italy and King Alfonso of Spain.

In 1927 he was made Professor of Surgery in the University of Durham. In 1934 he was elected President of the Medical Society of London and in 1935 delivered the Bradshaw Lecture at the Royal College of Surgeons.

After the war, Grey Turner was briefly famous for performing one of the earliest operations to attempt the removal of a bullet from a soldier's heart. The bullet was never removed, but Grey Turner's surgery saved the patient's life.

During the following decades, Grey Turner worked with early cancer research, and anticipated the development of chemotherapy ("We shall never overcome cancer by surgery: it will be something we will inject"). In 1925 he published an optimistic work entitled "Some encouragements in Cancer surgery".

In 1943-44 he was again elected President of Medical Society of London. in 1949, two years before his death, Grey Turner was made President of the XIII congress of the International Society of Surgeons in New Orleans.

He married Alice Grey Schofield, with whom he had 3 daughters and a son, Elston Grey-Turner, also a physician.

A type of bruising, Grey Turner's sign, was named after the surgeon.
