= Jeremiah Bryant =

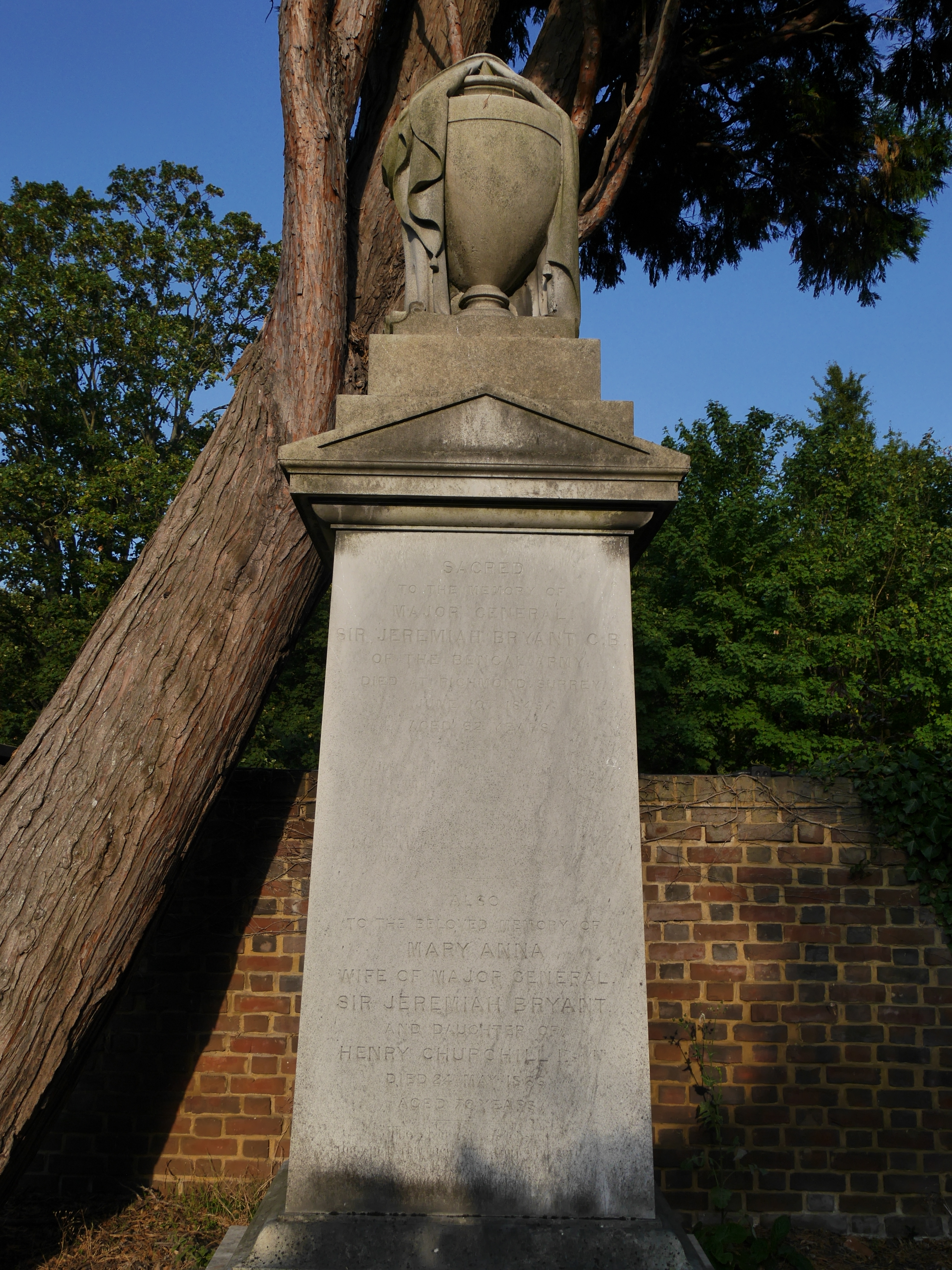
Funerary monument, St Peter's Church, Petersham

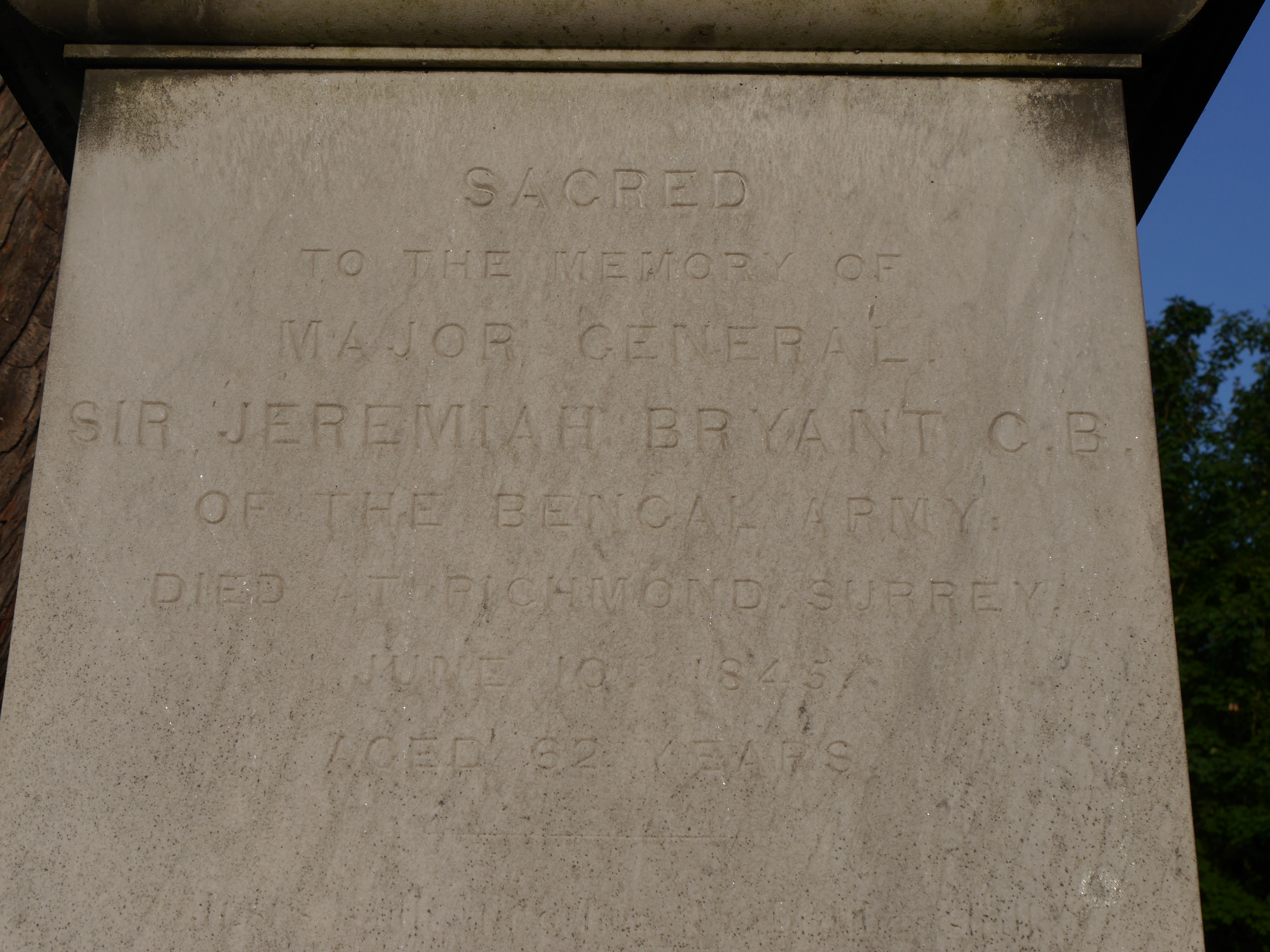
Funerary monument, St Peter's Church, Petersham

Major General Sir Jeremiah Bryant CB (bapt. 14 June 1783 – 10 June 1845) was a British Army officer in the Bengal Army.

Bryant was born in 1783 to Edward and Susannah Bryant. In 1832, he was living at Subathoo, British India, with his wife, Mary Anna Churchill, Lady Bryant. He lost an arm in battle.

His daughter Emily Susan Bryant married Arthur Lionel Tollemache. Their great-grandson was very briefly Edward Pelham-Clinton, 10th Duke of Newcastle at the end of his life.

He is buried at St Peter's Church, Petersham.
