= Beth Zanders =

New Zealand artist

- Born: Avril Elizabeth Baker; 2 April 1913; Christchurch, New Zealand
- Died: 21 June 2009 (aged 96); Cambridge, United Kingdom
- Known for: Painting
- Spouse: John Alexander Niblock (m. 1933; died 1943) Douglas William Alfred Zanders (m. 1949, died)

Avril Elizabeth Zanders (née Baker; 2 April 1913 – 21 June 2009), generally known as Beth Zanders, was a New Zealand artist.

== Career ==
Zanders painted primarily in oils, often still life or portraits. Notable works include: Magnolia (1950).

Her inclusion in W. A. Sutton's painting Homage to Frances Hodgkins (1951) highlights her involvement in the art community of Canterbury. The painting referenced the 'Pleasure Garden controversy' in which the art world of Christchurch was divided between proponents of so-called 'modern painting' and conservative forces. She is depicted alongside fellow artists Doris Lusk (also known as Doris Holland), Colin McCahon, Heathcote Helmore, Margaret Frankel, Rene Lonsdale, Alan Brassington, Olivia Spencer Bower, and John Oakley.

=== Exhibitions ===
Zanders exhibited with the Canterbury Society of Arts and the New Zealand Academy of Fine Arts. She was a member of The Group and was included in their exhibitions in 1949; 1950; 1951; 1952.

== Personal life ==
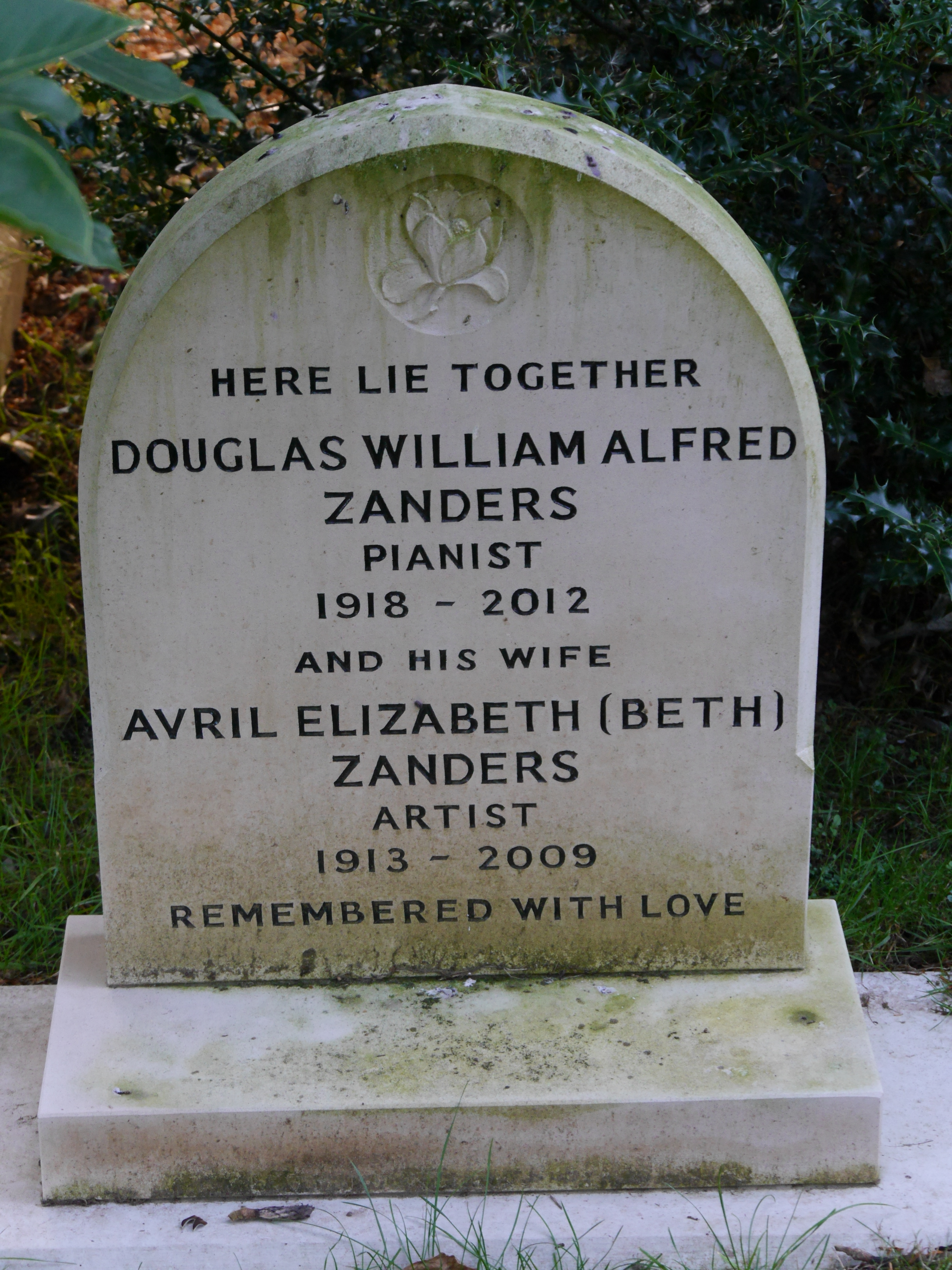
Headstone, St Peter's Church, Petersham

Born Avril Elizabeth Baker, she married John Alexander Niblock in 1933 (divorcing in 1943) and married Douglas William Alfred Zanders in 1949. They are both buried in St Peter's Church, Petersham.
