= Edward Croft-Murray =

British antiquarian

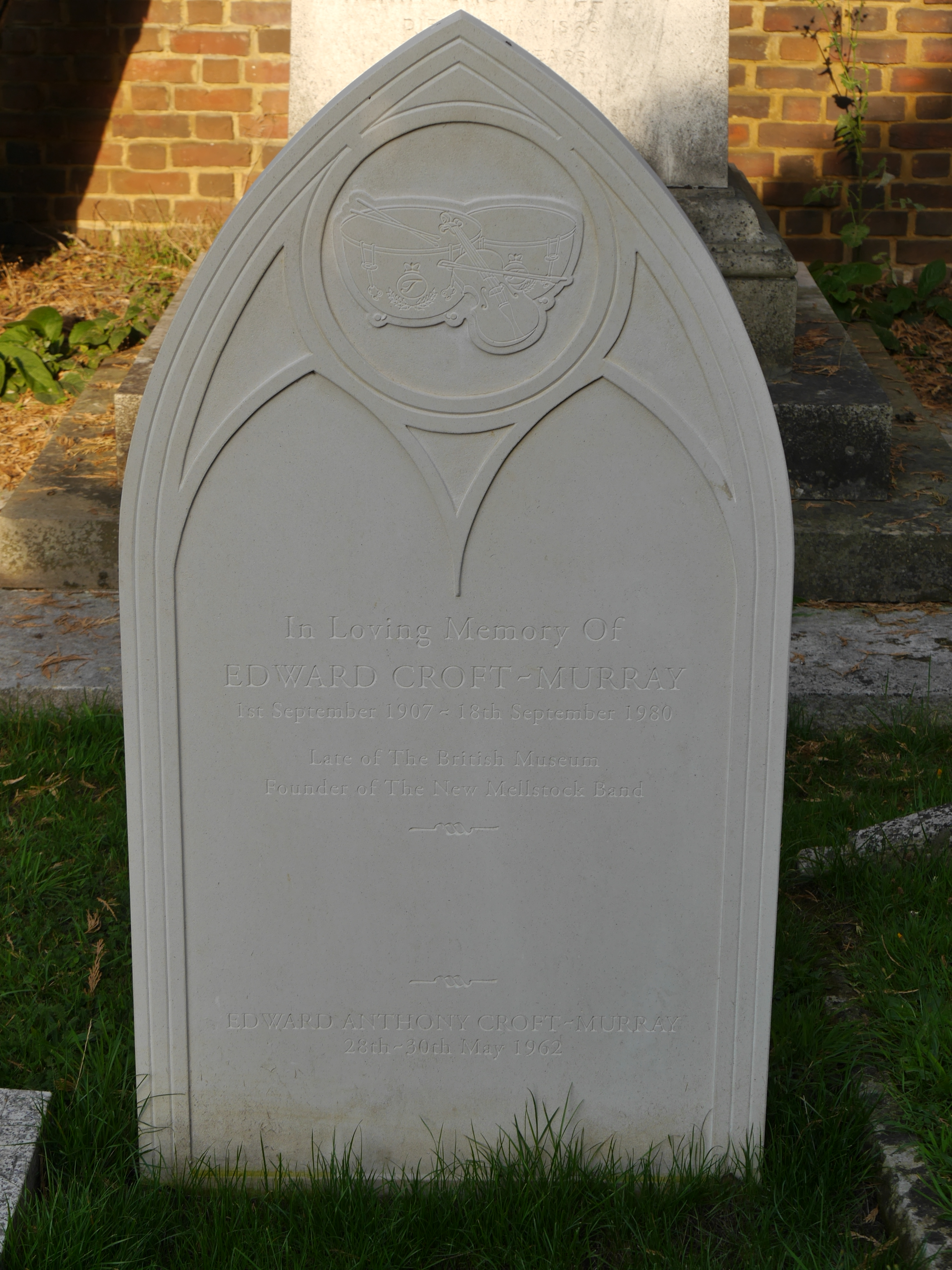
Funerary monument, St Peter's Church, Petersham

Major Edward Croft-Murray CBE (1 September 1907 – 18 September 1980) was a British antiquarian, an expert on British art, and Keeper of the Department of Prints and Drawings at the British Museum from 1954 to 1973.

He was born in Chichester and educated at Lancing College and Magdalen College, Oxford, and rose to the rank of Major in World War II.

He was descended from the Croft baronets of Croft Castle and related to a cousin of the Empress Josephine. He worked at the British Museum from 1933 as a volunteer then assistant keeper and became keeper of Prints and Drawings in 1954. During WW2 he served as one of the Monuments Men.

He was also interested in music and studied the violin at school. After his war service he founded ‘The New Mellstock Band’ comprising amateur and professional musicians who played Church Band and Georgian music. He composed music for Petersham church as 'an unknown pupil of J. C. Bach'.

He was appointed CBE in 1966. He lived at 4 Maids of Honour Row, Richmond and is buried at St Peter's Church, Petersham.

== Selected publications ==
- Catalogue of British Drawings, volume I: XVI-XVIIc, Edward Croft-Murray, Paul Hulton (1960)
- Decorative Painting in England 1537 to 1837, 2 Volumes, Edward Croft-Murray (1962)
