= Elston Grey-Turner =

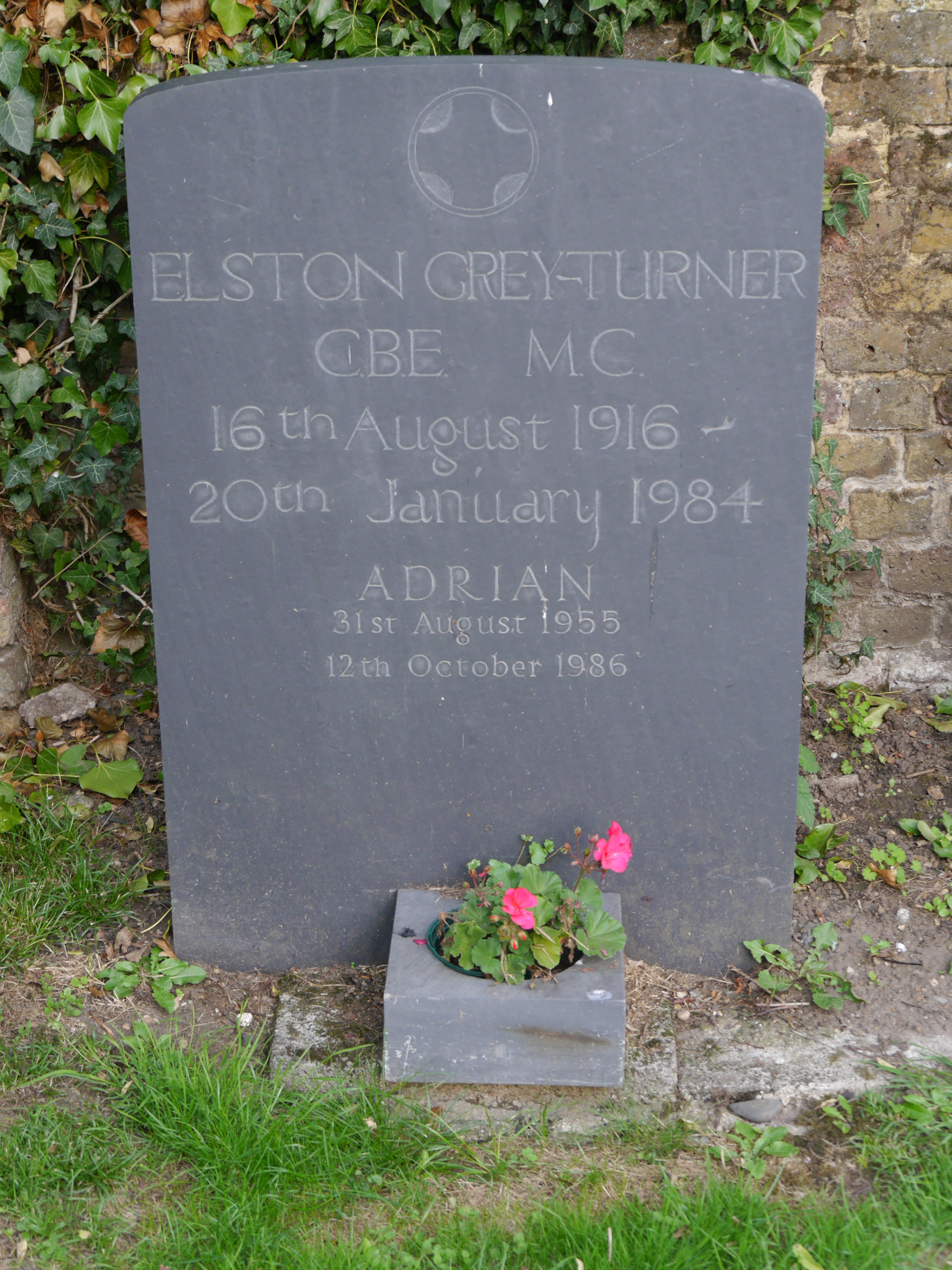
Funerary monument, St Peter's Church, Petersham

Elston Grey-Turner CBE MC TD (16 August 1916 – 20 January 1984) was a British medical doctor who served in World War II and was on the staff of the British Medical Association for many years.

== Education ==
The son of surgeon George Grey Turner, he was educated at Winchester College and Trinity College, Cambridge. He qualified in medicine in 1942.

== Service in World War II ==
He joined the Royal Army Medical Corps and served as regimental medical officer to the 2nd Battalion of the Coldstream Guards, 1942–1945. Among his assignments, he served at the Battle of Monte Cassino. He was awarded the Territorial Decoration, and also the Military Cross.

== Service in the British Medical Association ==
In 1948, he joined the staff of the British Medical Association. He was secretary from 1976–79. He was made vice president in 1982.

== Diarist and historian ==
He was a diarist whose notes about the war, the British Medical Association, and the development of the National Health Service have served as primary source material for researchers. He also was the Association's historian, and co-author of History of the British Medical Association.

== Burial ==
He is buried at St Peter's Church, Petersham.

== Surviving papers ==
His papers are archived at the Wellcome Library.
