= Humphry Tollemache =

Major-General Sir Humphry Tollemache Bt CB CBE DL
- Born: 10 August 1897; Eastbourne, Sussex
- Died: 30 March 1990 (aged 92)
- Burial place: St Peter's Church, Petersham
- Military career
- Allegiance: United Kingdom
- Branch: Royal Marines
- Service years: 1915–1952
- Rank: Major-General
- Commands: Royal Marines Depot (1946–47); Small Operations Group (1944–45); 3 Mobile Naval Base Brigade (1943–44)
- Conflicts: First World War; Second World War
- Awards: Companion of the Order of the Bath; Commander of the Order of the British Empire

Major-General Sir Humphry Thomas Tollemache, 6th Baronet, CB, CBE, DL (10 August 1897 – 30 March 1990) was a Royal Marines officer.

== Early life and career ==
Tollemache was the son of Sir Lyonel Tollemache, 4th Baronet and Hersilia Henrietta Diana Oliphant. He was educated at Eastbourne College. Commissioned into the Royal Marines in 1915, he served with the Grand Fleet from 1916 to 1918. Between 1929 and 1931 he was Adjutant of the Royal Marines Depot. From 1936 to 1939, he was brigade major.

== Second World War and after ==
Tollemache spent much of the Second World War in the Admiralty. On 13 December 1941, he was promoted to acting lieutenant colonel. His various appointments included command of Royal Marine deployments in the Middle East and the Far East (1939–1945), Commander of 3 Mobile Naval Base Brigade (1943–1944) and Commander of the Small Operations Group (1944–1945). When Tollemache (then Colonel) was appointed to command SOG on its formation in June 1944, Lieutenant Colonel Herbert Hasler was appointed as second-in-command.

Following the war, Tollemache became Commander of the Royal Marines Depot (1946–1947) and Director of Pay and Records Office, Royal Marines (1947–1949). Between 1949 and his retirement in 1952, he was General Officer Commanding the Portsmouth Group, Royal Marines, having been promoted to major general on 24 November 1949. He was invested as a Commander of the Order of the British Empire in 1950 and as a Companion of the Order of the Bath in 1952.

== Personal life ==
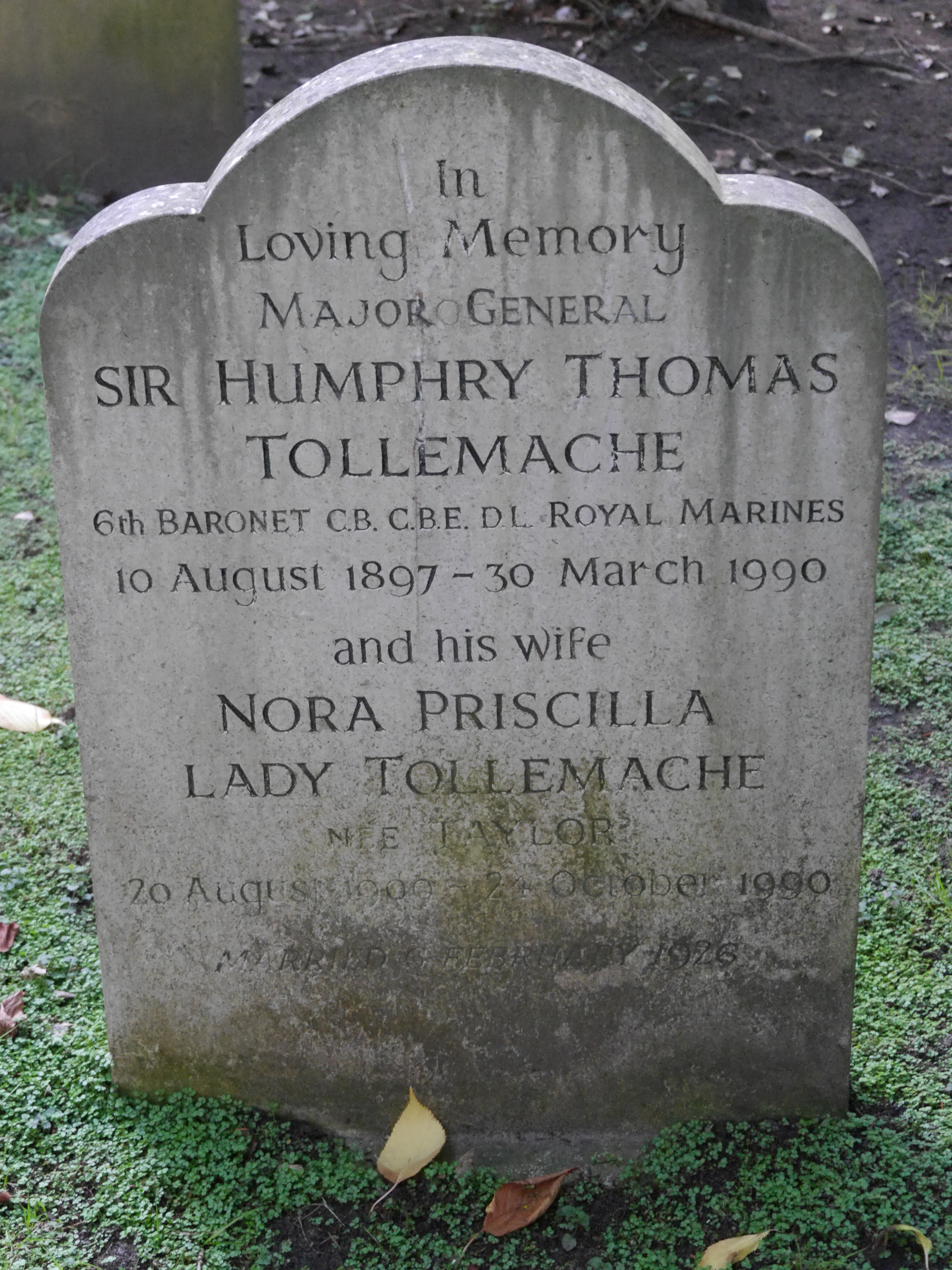
Funerary monument, St Peter's Church, Petersham

Tollemache married Nora Priscilla Taylor, the daughter of John Taylor, on 6 February 1926, and together they had two sons and two daughters.

Following the death of his brother, Cecil, in 1969, he succeeded to the Tollemache baronetcy. He is buried at St Peter's Church, Petersham, Richmond-upon-Thames, a village historically associated with the Tollemache Earls of Dysart.

Baronetage of Great Britain
Preceded by Cecil Tollemache	Baronet (of Hanby Hall); 1969–1990	Succeeded by Lyonel Tollemache
