= Gerald Beloe =

English cricketer

Personal information
- Full name: Gerald Harry Beloe
- Born: 21 November 1877; Westbury-on-Trym, Bristol, England
- Died: 1 October 1944 (aged 66); Brandon Hill, Bristol, England
- Batting: Left-handed
- Bowling: Slow left-arm orthodox

Domestic team information
- Years: Team
- 1898–1899: Gloucestershire

Career statistics
| Competition | First-class |
|---|---|
| Matches | 6 |
| Runs scored | 153 |
| Batting average | 7.50 |
| 100s/50s | –/1 |
| Top score | 52* |
| Balls bowled | – |
| Wickets | – |
| Bowling average | – |
| 5 wickets in innings | – |
| 10 wickets in match | – |
| Best bowling | – |
| Catches/stumpings | 4/– |
- Source: Cricinfo, 31 March 2012

Gerald Harry Beloe (21 November 1877 – 1 October 1944) was an English cricketer. Beloe was a left-handed batsman who bowled slow left-arm orthodox.

== Early life and education ==
He was born at Westbury-on-Trym, Bristol, and was educated at Marlborough College.

== Career ==
Beloe made his first-class debut for Gloucestershire against Middlesex in the 1898 County Championship. He made five further first-class appearances for the county, all of which came in the 1899 County Championship, with his last match coming against Middlesex at Lord's. In his six first-class matches for Gloucestershire, he scored a total of 153 runs at an average of 17.00, with a high score of 52 not out. This score was the only time he passed fifty and came against Kent.

== Death ==
He died at Brandon Hill, Bristol, on 1 October 1944.
