= Beloe Report =

1950s UK education reform

The Beloe Report, commissioned in the late 1950s in the United Kingdom, led directly to the implementation of the Certificate of Secondary Education, the CSE examination which would exist from 1965 to 1987. The CSE was withdrawn at the same time as the GCE Ordinary Level exam.

== History ==
The GCE exam had been introduced in 1951. The Beloe Committee met from 1958-60. Robert Beloe CBE was the Chief Education Officer of Surrey from 1940–59, beginning when only 35. He had created the system of grammar schools in Surrey in the late 1940s. He had created many bilateral schools in Surrey in the 1950s, which were effectively comprehensive schools; this was to reduce the cost of building brand new grammar schools, and made the implementation of the comprehensive system in Surrey, in the 1970s, more straightforward than other local education authorities. He was appointed CBE in the 1960 New Year Honours.

The report was published in July 1960 by a committee of the Secondary Schools Examinations Council - the Committee on Secondary School Examinations other than the G.C.E., appointed in July 1958. Robert Beloe died on 26 April 1984. The report was overseen by the Ministry of Education.

At the time, many of those at secondary schools left at age 15 - currently Year Ten. It would not be until 1973 that the school leaving age rose to 16, now known as Year Eleven. The CSE would be mainly, though not exclusively, aimed at people at secondary modern schools, or the early comprehensive schools. The new CSE exam would give secondary modern schools an incentive to have fifth forms - for those who voluntarily wanted to stay at school beyond the school leaving age; this would help prove that education futures were not always narrowly defined by the eleven-plus exam. The report may have had direct consequences for the idea of comprehensive schools; before the CSE, there was no widely recognized exam for most people who had not gained a place at grammar school.

=== Contents ===
The report, with scope for education in secondary schools in England, Wales and Northern Ireland, recommended that a new examination be introduced with a different emphasis from that of the highly-academic GCE O level, which required rigorous knowledge of subjects.

20% of those at 16 took the GCE exam, and the CSE would cover the next 20%. The exam was to be a different kind of exam to the GCE, and not simply a watered-down GCE. The exam would be set mainly by teachers, sitting on 20 regional bodies.

=== Implementation of the GCSE ===
Although the GCSE, introduced in 1986 with first examinations in 1988, covered much, if not most, of the ground of the previous CSE, the GCSE has not adequately replaced the rigour of what the former O-level offered. The Beloe Report therefore would eventually lead the way largely to what became the GCSE. The 1978 Waddell Report had advocated a common examination, prepared by Sir James Waddell, which hoped that the new common exam would be first sat by 1985.
