= Timeline of London (20th century) =

The following is a timeline of the history of London in the 20th century, the capital of England and the United Kingdom.

== 1900 to 1909 ==
- 1900
  - 9 January: Influenza outbreak in London.
  - 15 January: The London Hippodrome opens as a venue for circus performances.
  - 3 March: The Boundary Estate, Shoreditch, Britain's first council estate to be commenced 10 years previously, is officially inaugurated.
  - c. July: The Memorial to Heroic Self Sacrifice at Postman's Park in the City is unveiled.
  - 5 July: Thames Ironworks F.C. is relaunched as West Ham United F.C.
  - 30 July: The Central London Railway, core of the modern-day Central line (London Underground), opens.
  - 18 October: The Passmore Edwards Museum is opened in West Ham; it closes in 1994.
  - 1 November: London Government Act 1899 comes into effect, dividing the County of London into 28 metropolitan boroughs: Battersea, Bermondsey, Bethnal Green, Camberwell, Chelsea, Deptford, Finsbury, Fulham, Greenwich, Hammersmith, Hackney, Hampstead, Holborn, Islington, Kensington, Lambeth, Lewisham, Paddington, Poplar, St Marylebone, St Pancras, Shoreditch, Southwark, Stepney, Stoke Newington, Wandsworth, Westminster, and Woolwich (including North Woolwich). Westminster has been confirmed in its city status in the United Kingdom by letters patent on 27 October.
  - Prince Henry's Room at 17 Fleet Street is the first historic building to be acquired by the London County Council.
  - Hotel Russell in Russell Square opens to guests.
  - The music hall song "Burlington Bertie" is composed.
- 1901
  - 2 February: The funeral procession of Queen Victoria takes place from Victoria station to Paddington station.
  - 21 February: The Apollo Theatre opens on Shaftesbury Avenue.
  - 12 March: The Whitechapel Art Gallery, designed by Charles Harrison Townsend, opens.
  - 1 April: The United Kingdom Census 1901 takes place. London's population is over 4.5 million in the central area and over 6.6 million in the greater metropolitan area.
  - 4 April: Electric trams are introduced.
  - 18 May: Alexandra Palace opens to the public.
  - 20 June: Edward Elgar premières his concert overture Cockaigne (In London Town) at the Queen's Hall.
  - 29 June: The Horniman Museum, designed by Charles Harrison Townsend, opens in Forest Hill.
  - 5 August: Britain's first permanent cinema opens in Islington.
  - 20 November: The Metropolitan Borough of Kensington is granted royal status by charter.
  - Ealing Tenants begin the development of the Brentham Garden Suburb housing cooperative.
  - The London County Council begins the development of the Norbury Estate, the first beyond its boundaries at this time.
  - The London County Council takes over the blue plaque scheme from the Society of Arts.
  - The Hackney Empire opens as a music hall.
  - Will Barker begins making moving pictures in London.
- 1902
  - 1 March: The first GPO telephone exchange in London opens in the Faraday Building.
  - April
    - Vladimir Lenin, under the alias Jacob Richter, begins a year's stay in London, where he edits the newspaper Iskra at 37a Clerkenwell Green and studies in the British Museum Reading Room. In October, Leon Trotsky first meets him at Lenin's rented flat, 30 Holford Square, Pentonville.
    - The Roehampton Club is opened as a private members' sporting club.
  - 9 April: The Underground Electric Railways Company of London (UERCL) is formed to consolidate the group of Underground lines controlled by American financier Charles Yerkes.
  - 29 May: The London School of Economics is opened.
  - June: A cast of Thomas Thornycroft's sculpture Boadicea and Her Daughters is erected posthumously on the Victoria Embankment in Westminster.
  - July: The Leicester Galleries open to exhibit modern art in Leicester Square.
  - 4 August: The Greenwich foot tunnel under the Thames opens.
  - 9 August: Coronation of Edward VII and Alexandra at Westminster Abbey, postponed from 26 June due to the King's illness.
  - 22 November: The Golders Green Crematorium, the first in London, opens.
  - 1 December: The Metropolis Water Act creates the Metropolitan Water Board to absorb existing water suppliers on 24 June 1904.
  - The Ealing Studios are established for filmmaking by Will Barker.
  - The original Hammersmith Hospital is established.
  - Rosa Lewis acquires The Cavendish Hotel.
- 1903
  - 27 January: A fire at Colney Hatch Lunatic Asylum kills 51 people.
  - 6 March: The Tyburn Convent and Shrine of the Martyrs is established by the Adorers of the Sacred Heart of Montmartre.
  - 21 April: The new Baltic Exchange (building) opens in the City.
  - 20 May: The new Kew Bridge is opened by King Edward VII.
  - By June: The Roman Catholic Westminster Cathedral is opened.
  - June–August: London's wettest summer and year is recorded at Kew Gardens.
  - 18 June: An explosion at Royal Arsenal, Woolwich kills 16 people.
  - 23–27 June: The Royal Agricultural Society of England holds its annual show at its Park Royal ground for the first time. Although this is intended to be a permanent site, the RAS sells it after 3 years.
  - August: 2nd Congress of the Russian Social Democratic Labour Party moves from Brussels to London.
  - 2 November: The tabloid national newspaper Daily Mirror begins publication.
  - November: The London County Council erects its first blue plaque, to the historian Thomas Babington Macaulay, who died in 1859, at Holly Lodge, Campden Hill.
  - 16 December: The London County Council erects its earliest surviving blue plaque, to the novelist Charles Dickens, who died in 1870, on his former home in Doughty Street.
  - The London County Council's Latchmere Estate opens in Battersea, making it the first public housing in the United Kingdom to be built using a council's own direct labour force.
  - William Foyle and his brother Gilbert establish the bookselling business of Foyles.
  - The Pepys Club is founded.
  - Clement's Inn, last of the Inns of Chancery, is dissolved and demolished to make way for the redevelopment of Aldwych.
- 1904
  - 9 February: The 1904 City of London by-election is held.
  - 22 March: G. K. Chesterton's novel The Napoleon of Notting Hill is published.
  - 25 April: Herbert Beerbohm Tree establishes an Academy of Dramatic Art, which will become RADA, at His Majesty's Theatre in the Haymarket.
  - 9 June: The London Symphony Orchestra (LSO) performs its first concert.
  - 4 July: The branch railway to the original Uxbridge station is opened by the Metropolitan Railway.
  - 15 August: The Metropolitan Fire Brigade is renamed as the London Fire Brigade.
  - 1 September: Brentford F.C. first plays at Griffin Park.
  - 11 October: The Loftus Road Stadium is first used by Shepherd's Bush F.C.
  - Late October: The first members of what will become the Bloomsbury Group move to the Bloomsbury district.
  - ca. November: The Finchley fire brigade becomes the first to take delivery of a petrol-engined self-propelled motor fire pump.
  - 24 December: The Coliseum Theatre opens.
  - 27 December: The première of J. M. Barrie's play Peter Pan, or the Boy Who Wouldn't Grow Up takes place at the Duke of York's Theatre; it is published as a novel in 1911.
- 1905
  - February: Lots Road Power Station begins generating electricity for the Underground Group railways and tramways. Through the year, the District Railway and Circle line convert their passenger operations from steam to electric trains.
  - 1 May: The Anglican Diocese of Southwark created, which raises the Church of St Saviour and St Mary Overie to the dignity of Southwark Cathedral, and Edward Talbot is consecrated as the first bishop.
  - 10 March: Chelsea Football Club is founded.
  - 6 May: The Naval, Shipping and Fisheries Exhibition opens at Earl's Court.
  - 12 May: The Natural History Museum unveils its popular exhibit of "Dippy", an exact replica of the skeleton of the Diplodocus carnegii dinosaur.
  - 18 October: The London County Council's new street at Kingsway and the redevelopment of Aldwych are opened.
  - 21 October: Henry Wood first conducts a performance of his Fantasia on British Sea Songs at a Trafalgar Day concert.
- 1906
  - 13 January: Woolwich Town Hall is opened by the Labour MP Will Crooks, with the Woolwich Council having resisted a royal opening.
  - 24 February: The Kingsway tramway subway opens.
  - 27 February: The February 1906 City of London by-election is held.
  - 10 March: The Bakerloo line opens.
  - 15 May: Our Dumb Friends League opens its first animal hospital in Victoria.
  - 24 May
    - The Ritz Hotel opens in Piccadilly, making it the first significant steel-framed building in London, although regulations require the masonry external walls to be loadbearing.
    - Greenwich Power Station, which had begun construction in 1902, begins generating electricity for the London County Council Tramways.
  - 26 May: The replacement Vauxhall Bridge opens.
  - 28 July: The Tooting Bec Lido is opened as the Tooting Bathing-Lake on Tooting Commons.
  - 15 September: The Brown Dog affair: An anti-vivisection Brown Dog statue is erected in Battersea and provokes riots.
  - 23 October: Suffragettes disrupt the State Opening of Parliament.
  - 15 December: The Piccadilly line opens.
  - The Hampstead Garden Suburb is established by Samuel and Henrietta Barnett, and it is laid out by Raymond Unwin.
- 1907
  - 7 February: The "Mud March", the first large procession organized by the National Union of Women's Suffrage Societies, takes place.
  - 11 February: Explosions at Royal Arsenal, Woolwich shatter windows within a large radius.
  - 27 February: The Old Bailey (criminal court) building opens.
  - 22 March: The first taxicabs with taximeters begin operating in London.
  - 13 May–1 June: The 5th Congress of the Russian Social Democratic Labour Party is held at the Brotherhood Church in Hackney. Lenin, Trotsky, Stalin and Litvinov attend, the latter two staying in the Whitechapel Rowton House.
  - 22 June: The Charing Cross, Euston and Hampstead Railway opens; it is later merged into the Northern line.
  - 8 July: Imperial College of Science and Technology is formed by amalgamation of the Royal College of Science and the Royal School of Mines.
  - September: A cast of G. F. Watts' sculpture Physical Energy is erected posthumously in Kensington Gardens.
  - 11 September: Camden Town Murder: prostitute Emily Dimmock's throat is cut. On December 19, Robert Wood, an artist charged with the crime and defended by Edward Marshall Hall, is acquitted, to popular acclaim.
  - London County Council's Open Air School at Plumstead is established for physically handicapped children.
- 1908
  - 26 May–October: The Franco-British Exhibition is held at what becomes known as White City in Shepherd's Bush.
  - 12 June: The Rotherhithe Tunnel opens to road traffic and pedestrians.
  - 13 June: The Women's suffrage march and rally takes place at the Royal Albert Hall.
  - June: The distinctive 'bar and circle' design of station nameboards is introduced on the London Underground.
  - 13–25 July: The 1908 Summer Olympics is held at the White City Stadium as part of the Franco-British Exhibition and of a festival of sport that began on 14 May. The marathon is run on 24 July, and figure skating events are held in Knightsbridge on 28–29 October.
  - 19 July: The Metropolitan Railway converts the last of its steam-hauled passenger services south of Harrow to electric operation.
  - October: The first Ideal Home Exhibition is held at Olympia sponsored by the Daily Mail newspaper.
  - November: Horace, Eustace and Oswald Short found Short Brothers in Battersea, making it the first aircraft manufacturing company in England.
  - Walter Sickert paints the series of problem pictures The Camden Town Murder.
  - The first illuminated advertising sign at Piccadilly Circus is for Perrier.
- 1909
  - 23 January: The "Tottenham outrage", an armed robbery and the murder of a 10-year-old boy and a police constable in Tottenham, is carried out by 2 Latvian anarchists.
  - 26 February: The first colour film using Kinemacolor is shown at the Palace Theatre.
  - 15 March: The department store Selfridges, Oxford Street opens.
  - 31 March: The Port of London Authority takes over the London docks, and also management of the Thames Tideway from the Thames Conservancy.
  - 5 May: The Metropolitan Water Board's Honor Oak covered reservoir is inaugurated.
  - 20 May: The Imperial International Exhibition opens at White City.
  - 5 June: Alliott Verdon Roe begins flights in the first fixed-wing aircraft of all-British manufacture, the Roe I Triplane, from Walthamstow Marshes.
  - 26 June: The Victoria and Albert Museum opens in the building designed for it by Aston Webb in South Kensington by Edward VII and Queen Alexandra, and the Science Museum is constituted as a fully independent institution.
  - 1 July: Senior British Indian Government official Curzon Wyllie is shot dead at the Imperial Institute in South Kensington and a bystander fatally wounded; the assassin, Madan Lal Dhingra, an Indian nationalist student, is subsequently sentenced to death and hanged at Pentonville Prison on 17 August.
  - 14 September:
    - The owners of J. Lyons and Co. open the Strand Palace Hotel and their first Corner House restaurant on Coventry Street in the same year.
    - Trams in London are brought into the City for the first time when the Lord Mayor of London, George Wyatt Truscott, ceremonially drives the first tram over Blackfriars Bridge, which has been widened to accommodate the tramway.
  - 2 October: The first match is played at the Rugby Football Union's Twickenham Stadium, Harlequins v. Richmond.
  - 1 December: The London, Brighton and South Coast Railway publicly inaugurates London's first suburban surface railway electrification system on its South London line, known as the "Elevated Electric".
  - 20 December: A fire at Arding & Hobbs department store in Clapham kills 9 staff.

== 1910 to 1919 ==
- 1910
  - 24 February: The Electric Cinema, Notting Hill opens.
  - 6 May: King Edward VII dies at Buckingham Palace. No later monarch will die in London for at least a century.
  - 14 May–29 October: The Japan–British Exhibition at White City.
  - 28 June: The Roman Catholic Westminster Cathedral is consecrated.
  - 18 October
    - Dr. Crippen is put on trial at the Old Bailey for uxoricide at Hilldrop Crescent, Holloway, of which he is convicted on 22 October. He is hanged on 23 November in Pentonville Prison.
    - First B-type double-decker bus, built and operated by the London General Omnibus Company, enters service. It was designed by Frank Searle, and is considered to be the first mass-produced bus. Around 2,800 are built up to 1919, displacing LGOC's last horse buses by the end of 1911 with examples in regular use up to 1926, around 900 seeing service on the Western Front (World War I).
  - 26 December: The London Palladium music hall opens.
  - After May: Admiralty Arch is completed.
  - Crosby Hall is moved from Bishopsgate to Chelsea.
  - The Fine Art Trade Guild is established in London.
- 1911
  - 3 January: Siege of Sidney Street: the Metropolitan Police and Scots Guards engage in a shootout with a criminal gang of Latvian anarchists holed up in a building in the East End following a bungled jewel robbery on 16 December 1910 in Houndsditch and the shooting of 3 policemen.
  - 1 February: The last and largest warship built on the Thames, HMS Thunderer is launched by the Thames Ironworks and Shipbuilding Company in Blackwall.
  - 11 March: The Victoria Memorial is dedicated outside Buckingham Palace.
  - 2 April: The 1911 census is taken, and the suffragette Emily Davison hides in a cupboard in the crypt of the Palace of Westminster so that she can legitimately be recorded as resident on census night at the House of Commons. Greater London population: 7,251,338.
  - 12 May: The Festival of Empire opens at The Crystal Palace to celebrate the forthcoming coronation.
  - 16 May: The Victoria Memorial is unveiled outside Buckingham Palace, and The Mall is completed as a ceremonial approach.
  - 18 May: The Other Club political dining society holds its first dinner.
  - 22 June: The coronation of King George V and Queen Mary takes place in Westminster Abbey, and the processions pass through Admiralty Arch for the first time.
  - 9–26 September: The world's first scheduled airmail post service flies between Hendon and Windsor, Berkshire.
  - 4 October: The first escalator on the London Underground system opens to the public at Earl's Court tube station.
  - November: Virginia Stephen begins to share her brother Adrian Stephen's London house at 38 Brunswick Square with other members of the Bloomsbury Group: Leonard Woolf (her future husband), John Maynard Keynes and Duncan Grant.
  - 21 November: Suffragettes storm Parliament; all those arrested choose prison terms.
  - 26 December: The New Prince's theatre is the last to open on Shaftesbury Avenue
  - Westminster Central Hall is completed as a Wesleyan Methodist church.
  - Gidea Park, as the Romford Garden Suburb, and Totterdown Fields, the first London County Council cottage estate, are completed.
  - The Royal Automobile Club moves to "a somewhat florid French Renaissance style" building on Pall Mall.
  - The Camden Town Group of post-Impressionist artists are established.
- 1912
  - 1 January:
    - The Underground Electric Railways Company of London (UERL) takes over the London General Omnibus Company, which leads to the widespread adoption of the 'bar and circle' logo in publicity.
    - The General Post Office takes over the whole business of the National Telephone Company.
  - 1 March: Suffragettes smash shop windows in the West End, especially around Oxford Street.
  - 21 March: London Museum inaugurated in Kensington Palace (opens to public 8 April).
  - 30 March: The Boat Race is abandoned after both crews sink. It is restarted on 1 April, and Oxford win.
  - April/May: Thousands of Jewish workers in the West End garment trade strike, followed by thousands more in the East End inspired by Rudolf Rocker.
  - May: The East Finchley Picturedrome, built in 1910, opens as a cinema.
  - 1 May: The Statue of Peter Pan appears in Kensington Gardens.
  - June: The Cheapside Hoard of early 17th-century jewellery is found in the City and secured for the new London Museum.
  - 10 August: Frank McClean flies a Short Brothers floatplane up the Thames between the upper and lower spans of Tower Bridge and underneath London Bridge.
  - 26 October: The Woolwich foot tunnel opens under the Thames.
- 1913
  - 8 January: The Poetry Bookshop is established in Bloomsbury by Harold Monro; it serves as a literary meeting place until its closure in 1926.
  - 10 February: News of the failure of Capt. Scott's 1912 Polar expedition reaches London.
  - 15 March: The King George V Reservoir in Enfield is inaugurated for the Metropolitan Water Board.
  - 20 May: The first Chelsea Flower Show takes place.
  - Summer–Autumn: Sir Aston Webb remodels Buckingham Palace's main East Front.
  - 26 June: Miss Emily Dawson is the first female magistrate to be appointed.
  - 19 July: The London County Council Tramways operates its last horse trams, in Islington.
  - 26 July
    - 50,000 women take part in a pilgrimage in Hyde Park organised by the National Union of Women's Suffrage Societies.
    - King's College Hospital opens on its new site in Camberwell.
  - 6 September: Arsenal F.C., which was previously based in Plumstead in South London, move into their new stadium in Highbury.
  - November: John Archer becomes the first black mayor of a London borough in Battersea.
  - Caroline Spurgeon becomes the first female professor at the University of London.
  - The London Group of artists is formed by merger of the Camden Town Group and the Vorticists.
  - The Twickenham Film Studios are established.
  - The Middlesex Guildhall building is completed in Parliament Square in the Gothic style.
  - Carter's Crisps of London introduce the commercial manufacture of potato crisps to the UK.
  - Ralph Vaughan Williams completes his Symphony No. 2 'A London Symphony', with its premiere taking place in March 1914.
- 1914
  - March: The London Group hold their first art exhibition at the Goupil Gallery.
  - 10 March: The suffragette Mary Richardson damages the Velázquez painting the Rokeby Venus in the National Gallery with a meat cleaver.
  - 2 April: The Geffrye Museum is opened in Shoreditch by the London County Council.
  - 4 May: The suffragette Mary Wood attacks John Singer Sargent's portrait of Henry James at the Royal Academy Summer Exhibition with a meat cleaver. At the same exhibition on 12 May, Gertrude Mary Ansell attacks the recently deceased Hubert von Herkomer's portrait of the Duke of Wellington, and on 26 May, 'Mary Spencer' (Maude Kate Smith) attacks George Clausen's painting Primavera.
  - 8 June: The City Livery Club is founded.
  - 11 June: A suffragette bomb explodes in Westminster Abbey near the coronation chair.
  - 14 June: 7 people, including 4 children, are killed by lightning on Wandsworth Common.
  - 1 July: Isleworth Studios officially opens for film production.
  - 31 July: London Stock Exchange closes until 4 January 1915.
  - 4 August
    - London's last horse-drawn omnibus operates in Peckham.
    - War is declared by the United Kingdom on the German Empire at 23:00.
  - September: The cover of magazine London Opinion first carries the iconic drawing by Alfred Leete of Lord Kitchener with the recruiting slogan Your Country Needs You, used as poster in the London district.
  - 11 September: Reduction in street lighting as an air raid precaution.
  - 14 October: The Royal Flying Corps first permanently stations aircraft at Hounslow Heath Aerodrome.
  - 17 October: Anti-German riots break out in Deptford.
  - 6 November: Carl Hans Lody becomes the first of 11 convicted World War I German spies to be shot at dawn by firing squad in the Tower of London up to 1916.
  - December: The Post office sets up its Home Depot to sort mail for the military and covers 4 acres (1.6 ha) of Regent's Park.
- 1915
  - 1 January: The Ilford rail crash kills 10 people on the Great Eastern Main Line.
  - February: The London County Council establishes an emergency ambulance corps, predecessor of the London Ambulance Service, under the control of the London Fire Brigade. By July 1916, it is staffed entirely by women.
  - 3 May: The Royal Flying Corps opens Northolt aerodrome, which eventually becomes RAF Northolt.
  - 26 May: The King George V Military hospital opens in a converted new stationery warehouse in Waterloo.
  - 31 May: The effective bombing by German Zeppelins begins, and 7 people are killed.
  - 19 July: A cast of Auguste Rodin's sculpture The Burghers of Calais is unveiled in Victoria Tower Gardens in Westminster.
  - 8 September: A Zeppelin raid destroys No. 61 Farringdon Road; it is rebuilt in 1917 as The Zeppelin Building.
  - 13 October: Zeppelin bombs hit West End theatres, a bus, and shatter the fine Flemish windows in Lincoln's Inn chapel.
  - October: Stag Lane Aerodrome is set up in Edgware.
  - The Statue of Florence Nightingale in St James's is erected.
  - The term 'Metro-land' is first coined to promote the area served by the Metropolitan Railway.
- 1916
  - 5 June: The School of Oriental Studies is chartered.
  - 3 August:
    - The musical comedy Chu Chin Chow, written, produced, directed and starring Oscar Asche, with music by Frederic Norton, premières at His Majesty's Theatre. It will run for 5 years and a total of 2,238 performances, more than twice as many as any previous musical and a record that will stand for nearly 40 years.
    - Sir Roger Casement is executed by hanging at Pentonville Prison for treason.
  - 28 November: The first bombing of central London by a fixed-wing aircraft takes place when a German LVG C.II biplane drops 6 bombs near Victoria station.
  - Big Ben is silenced until the Armistice of 11 November 1918.
  - The Underground Electric Railways Company of London adopts Johnston (typeface) as part of its corporate identity.
- 1917
  - 19 January: Silvertown explosion: a blast at a munitions factory in east London kills 73 people and injures over 400 people. The resulting fire causes over £2,000,000 worth of damage.
  - April: Leonard and Virginia Woolf take delivery of the hand printing press they require to establish the Hogarth Press at their home, Hogarth House in Richmond upon Thames.
  - 4/5 May: Cleopatra's Needle is damaged by bombs dropped on London by fixed-wing aircraft.
  - 6/7 May: 1 person is killed by a bomb dropped on London by a fixed-wing aircraft.
  - 7 May: The mass explosion of mines in the Battle of Messines on the Western Front (World War I) can be felt in London.
  - 13 June: Daylight bombing raid on the London area by fixed-wing aircraft: 162 people are killed, including at least 18 children in a primary school in Poplar and considerable damage to Liverpool Street station.
  - 7 July: A bomb damages the Ironmongers' Hall beyond repair.
  - 15 August: American troops march through London.
  - 19 October: The worst Zeppelin bombing of London takes place, killing 32 people: 7 in Piccadilly, 10 in Camberwell and 15 in Hither Green.
  - 23 December: The London Fire Brigade last uses a steam fire engine, at a fire in Southampton Street, Peckham.
  - The Ivy restaurant is opened by Abel Giandellini.
  - The London postal districts are subdivided by numbers.
- 1918
  - 28 January: Night of unusually heavy bombing in London and south-east England.
  - 17 February: Bomb damage to St Pancras railway station.
  - March 7: A single bomb destroys 4 4-storey houses in Paddington.
  - 30 August: Strike of 20,000 London policemen with demands of increased pay and union recognition.
  - 27 October–2 November: 2,200 deaths in London over this period due to the "Spanish flu".
  - 11 November: The Armistice: World War I ends at 11.00. From 1919, a minute's silence on this date commemorates the lives lost; this is increased to 2 minutes after World War II.
  - The British Antique Dealers' Association is headquartered in London.
  - The South Suburban Co-operative Society, a consumers' co-operative, is formed by merger of the Croydon Co-operative Society, which was established in 1887, with others.
- 1919
  - 27 February: Princess Patricia of Connaught is married to Commander The Hon. Alexander Ramsay, making this the first royal wedding at Westminster Abbey since the 14th century.
  - March: The "Battle of Bow Street" takes place between North American servicemen and the Metropolitan Police.
  - 18 July: The Cenotaph, Whitehall is unveiled as a temporary memorial.
  - 31 July: Police strike in London and Liverpool for recognition of the National Union of Police and Prison officers; over 2,000 strikers are dismissed.
  - 25 August: The Aircraft Transport and Travel airline begins operating its daily route to Paris–Le Bourget Airport from Hounslow Heath Aerodrome.
  - 12 September: The first gold fixing takes place in the City of London. From later this month until 2004, it takes place in the N M Rothschild & Sons offices in New Court, St Swithin's Lane.
  - 30 September: The compositors and pressmen working at the Daily Sketch newspaper refuse to print the paper until an editorial criticising an ongoing railway strike is deleted.
  - September: The London County Council admits its first adult students to its literary institutes, of which the City Literary Institute will be the only survivor.
  - October: The "Mobile Patrol Experiment", forerunner of the Metropolitan Police Service's Flying Squad, is created.
  - 30 December: Lincoln's Inn admits its first female bar student.
  - Of the 13,794 hackney carriages licensed to ply for hire this year, less than 2,000 are horse-drawn.
  - The construction of the Wormholt Estate in Hammersmith, a pioneering example of postwar public housing in the United Kingdom, begins.

== 1920 to 1929 ==
- 1920
  - 17 March: The Edith Cavell Memorial is unveiled by Queen Alexandra in St Martin's Place.
  - 29 March: Croydon Aerodrome opens.
  - 13 May: In the "Hands Off Russia" campaign, London dockers refuse to load the SS Jolly George with munitions intended for Poland in the Polish–Soviet War.
  - 9 June: The Imperial War Museum opens at The Crystal Palace.
  - 13 July: The London County Council bans aliens from almost all council jobs.
  - 18 August: The first night bus services are introduced.
  - September: The London Co-operative Society, a consumers' co-operative, is established by merger of the Stratford and Edmonton Co-operative Societies.
  - 11 November: The Cenotaph, Whitehall, designed by Edwin Lutyens, is unveiled as a permanent memorial to commemorate the dead of World War I; and The Unknown Warrior is buried in Westminster Abbey.
  - 14 December: 1920 Golders Green Handley Page O/400 crash: two airline passengers and both crew killed after take-off from Cricklewood Aerodrome.
  - Devonshire House in Piccadilly is demolished.
  - The London School of Journalism is founded.
  - The Woolwich foot tunnel is used by about 28,000 pedestrians on average.
- 1921
  - 17 March: Dr Marie Stopes opens the UK's first birth control clinic in Holloway.
  - 26 April: The police patrol London on motorcycles for the first time.
  - 6 June: Southwark Bridge opens.
  - 19 June: The Greater London population is 7,476,168.
  - 8 July: The Port of London Authority opens King George V Dock, the last of London's upstream enclosed docks to be constructed.
  - 1 September: The Poplar Rates Rebellion takes place, led by George Lansbury. The Borough council in Poplar withholds collection of part of its rates, which leads to 6 weeks’ imprisonment for 30 councillors, including 7 women, and hasty passage of The London Authorities (Financial Provision) Act through Parliament to equalise tax burdens between rich and poor boroughs.
  - 9 September: Charlie Chaplin visits London, where he was probably born in 1889, and is met by thousands.
  - The London County Council begins the construction of a large estate of public housing in Bellingham. It is followed by the nearby Downham Estate from 1924.
  - The total length of tramways in Greater London is 350 miles.
  - Around 400 passengers a week fly from Croydon aerodrome to Paris, Brussels, and Amsterdam.
- 1922
  - 21 March: The rebuilt Waterloo station officially opens.
  - 11 May: 2LO becomes the second radio station to broadcast regularly in the UK, operating from Marconi House on The Strand on a daily basis.
  - 19 May: The 1922 City of London by-election is held.
  - 22 June: Field marshal Sir Henry Wilson is killed by Irish republican gunmen outside his home in Belgravia.
  - 17 July: County Hall opens as the new headquarters of the London County Council.
  - July: HMS President (1918) is permanently moored on the Thames alongside Victoria Embankment as a drill ship for the Royal Naval Reserve.
  - 9 November: Ada Salter becomes the first female mayor of a London borough in Bermondsey and the country's first Labour mayoress.
  - 14 November: The radio station 2LO transfers to the British Broadcasting Company (BBC).
- 1923
  - 28 April: The Empire Stadium, Wembley, opens to the public for the first time and holds the FA Cup Final between Bolton Wanderers F.C. and London football club West Ham United. Crowds are cleared from the pitch by mounted police, including one on a white horse. Bolton win.
  - September: T. S. Eliot's poem The Waste Land (1922) is first published in Britain in book form complete with notes in a limited edition by the Hogarth Press of Richmond upon Thames. This is run by Eliot's Bloomsbury Group friends Leonard and Virginia Woolf, with the type handset by Virginia being completed in July.
  - 27 November: The City and South London Railway Tube tunnel, which is under reconstruction, collapses under Newington Causeway.
- 1924
  - 1 February: The 1924 City of London by-election is held.
  - 2 February: A substantially rewritten version of Roi Cooper Megrue and Walter Hackett's 1914 farce It Pays to Advertise in a new production by actor-manager Tom Walls opens at the Aldwych Theatre. It runs until 10 July 1925 for a total of 598 performances, and is the first of a sequence of 12 "Aldwych farces".
  - March: Leonard and Virginia Woolf move themselves and the Hogarth Press back to a house in Bloomsbury at 52 Tavistock Square.
  - 31 March: The last of 1,702 new steam locomotives is built at Stratford Works, a GER Class L77 for suburban services from Liverpool Street station. This is the last full-size locomotive built in London.
  - 20 April: The opening of a Euston–Camden Town link connects the previously separate City & South London and Charing Cross, Euston & Hampstead Tube railways.
  - 23 April: The British Empire Exhibition opens at Wembley for the first of 2 seasons.
- 1925
  - February: The statue of Eros is taken away from Piccadilly Circus so that the new Underground station can be built. It is temporarily located in Victoria Embankment Gardens until returned in 1931.
  - 14 May: Virginia Woolf's novel Mrs Dalloway is published by the Hogarth Press in Bloomsbury. Woolf is beginning work on To the Lighthouse.
  - 19 May: Jacob Epstein's Rima, the Hudson memorial, is unveiled in Hyde Park by the Prime Minister, Stanley Baldwin, who is among those disconcerted by the sculpture's modernity.
  - 13 June: The Metropolitan Water Board's Queen Mary Reservoir opens in Middlesex.
  - 22 July: The first of Ben Travers' "Aldwych farces", A Cuckoo in the Nest, opens at the Aldwych Theatre.
  - 2 October
    - John Logie Baird successfully transmits the first television pictures with a greyscale image.
    - London's first double-decker buses with covered top decks are introduced.
  - The London Power Company is formed as an electricity generating and bulk supply company by the merger of ten small companies.
  - The West African Students' Union is established.
- 1926
  - 16 January: A BBC radio play about a worker's revolution in London causes a panic among those who have not heard the preliminary announcement that it is a satire on broadcasting.
  - 26 January: John Logie Baird demonstrates his television system from a room in Frith Street, Soho. In 1928, Selfridges sell the first set.
  - 9 February: Flooding in London suburbs.
  - c. February: The K2 red telephone box, designed by Giles Gilbert Scott, is introduced, chiefly in the London area.
  - 3–12 May: The 1926 United Kingdom general strike takes place.
  - 13 September: An extension of the London Underground Tube line from Clapham Common to Morden and a new link under the Thames between Kennington and Charing Cross complete a through rail route between Morden and Edgware. of 19.32 mi. (31.94 km). This is initially known as the Edgware, Highgate & Morden line, and later the Northern line, and the station buildings for the Morden extension are the first significant designs for the network by the architect Charles Holden.
  - 23 October: The Fazal Mosque, the first purpose-built in London and the first Ahmadiyya mosque in Britain, is completed in Southfields.
  - Veeraswamy Indian restaurant opens in Regent Street; it is the oldest surviving Indian restaurant in the United Kingdom.
- 1927
  - 14 February: Alfred Hitchcock's silent film thriller The Lodger: A Story of the London Fog released.
  - 25 March: Evelyn Sharp's The London Child, which deals with the plight of slum children, is published.
  - 4 May: Charing Cross Trunk Murder.
  - 12 May: The police raid the London office of the Soviet trading company ARCOS.
  - 29 May: 120,000 people welcome Charles Lindbergh to Croydon Airport.
  - 7 October: The death of Anglo-Irish businessman and philanthropist Edward Guinness, 1st Earl of Iveagh takes place at Grosvenor Place. He leaves Kenwood House on Hampstead Heath to the nation as a museum for his art collection, the "Iveagh Bequest", and the surrounding estate is added to the Heath to preserve it from housing development, opening to the public in 1928.
  - 3 December: The Post Office Railway, a private Tube line for carrying mail, opens.
  - 21 December ("Slippery Wednesday"): 1,600 people are hospitalised in London when they hurt themselves on the icy streets. There is a White Christmas.
- 1928
  - 6–7 January: The 1928 Thames flood, caused by a storm surge meeting a high river level due to snowmelt, occurs, and 14 people drown. On 7 January, the moat at the Tower of London, which was drained in 1843 and planted with grass, is completely refilled, and the basement of the Tate Gallery floods.
  - March: The Science Museum opens in its own building in Exhibition Road.
  - 28 April–5 March 1929: Three members of the same family in South Croydon die from arsenic poisoning; no-one is ever arrested in connection with the incident.
  - 3 September: Alexander Fleming accidentally rediscovers the antibiotic Penicillin at St Mary's Hospital, Paddington.
  - October: The Firestone Tyre Factory, designed by Wallis, Gilbert and Partners in Art Deco style, opens on the 'Golden Mile' of the Great West Road.
  - 20 December: Gas explosion in High Holborn.
  - British Home Stores (BHS) opens its first department store in Brixton.
  - The first police boxes with telephones are erected in London.
- 1929
  - 3 March: Ludgate Hill railway station closes to passengers.
  - 14 May: The Grosvenor House Hotel opens on Park Lane.
  - 5 July: Heston Air Park opens.
  - 20 September: Clarence Hatry confesses to financial forgery.
  - 3 October: The Dominion Theatre opens on Tottenham Court Road.
  - 28 October: There is a sharp fall on the London Stock Exchange following a similar crash on Wall Street in New York City on 24 October.
  - 1 December: The Underground Electric Railways Company of London officially opens its notable new headquarters building at 55 Broadway above St James's Park station, designed by Charles Holden and incorporating sculptures by Jacob Epstein, Eric Gill and Henry Moore.
  - The Oxo Tower is completed in Southwark.
  - First Tesco grocery store is opened in Burnt Oak, Edgware by Jack Cohen.
  - Foyles bookshop moves to its new larger premises in the Foyles Building on Charing Cross Road.
  - The author J. M. Barrie donates the copyrights of his play Peter Pan, or The Boy Who Wouldn't Grow Up to Great Ormond Street Hospital for sick children. By special legislation, the hospital continues to benefit from royalties in perpetuity.

== 1930 to 1939 ==
- 1930
  - 9 March: The BBC radio station 2LO becomes the London Regional Programme.
  - June: Harmondsworth Aerodrome at Heathrow begins operating.
  - 29 September: The Whitehall Theatre opens.
  - 15 October: The New Victoria Cinema and variety theatre opens.
  - The new offices for Crawford's Advertising Agency at 233 High Holborn, designed by Frederick Etchells with Herbert A. Welch, are London's earliest significant example of the International Style in architecture.
- 1931
  - 6 January: Sadler's Wells Theatre reopens under the management of Lilian Baylis.
  - 13 March: The League of Coloured Peoples is founded.
  - 18 April: The Dorchester hotel opens on Park Lane.
  - 26 April: The UK Census takes place. London's population is 4,397,003 in the county and 8,203,942 in Greater London.
  - 5 May: The Vic-Wells Ballet, later to become The Royal Ballet, debuts.
  - 15 May: Shoppers in Bayswater escape with their lives when a chemical factory explodes.
  - 16 May: The London United Tramways introduce the first trolleybuses in London between Twickenham and Teddington.
  - 23 May: The Zoological Society of London opens Whipsnade Zoo in Bedfordshire.
  - 19 July: Sudbury Town station on the London Underground's Piccadilly line opens as rebuilt by Charles Holden, making it the first of his iconic modern designs for the network.
  - 7 September
    - The Second round Table Conference on the constitutional future of India opens in London with Mahatma Gandhi representing the Indian National Congress.
    - The Granada Cinema, Tooting opens with a spectacular interior.
  - October: The first vehicle, a light truck, comes off the Ford Dagenham production line.
  - 12 November: The Abbey Road Studios are opened by Sir Edward Elgar.
  - 21 November: The infamous Red-and-White Party, given by Arthur Jeffress in Maud Allan's Regent's Park townhouse, marks the end of the "Bright young things" subculture in Britain.
  - 27 December: The statue of Eros returns to Piccadilly Circus after a nine-year absence.
  - Daily Express Building in Fleet Street constructed.
- 1932
  - 3 February: The Windmill Theatre in Soho opens as a revue venue (closes 1964).
  - 8 March: The Honourable Company of Master Mariners, formed on 25 June 1926, becomes the first City livery company to be granted this status since 1746.
  - 10 March: Victoria Coach Station opens.
  - 15 March: The first BBC radio broadcast comes from the new Broadcasting House, and all programmes transfer from Savoy Hill on 15 May.
  - 19 July: The replacement Lambeth Bridge opens.
  - Summer: The Open Air Theatre, Regent's Park is established as a regular venue.
  - October: The Courtauld Institute of Art opens.
  - 7 October: The London Philharmonic Orchestra (LPO) makes its debut, at the Queen's Hall.
  - 27 October: The arrival of the National Hunger March in London leads to several violent clashes with police.
  - 10 December: The branch railway to Stanmore is opened by the Metropolitan Railway (it transfers to the Bakerloo line, then to the Jubilee line by 1979).
  - The Hoover Building on the Western Avenue in Perivale is designed by Wallis, Gilbert and Partners in Art Deco style.
  - Ford of Britain begins Fordson tractor production at Dagenham.
  - Queen Mary's Rose Garden is laid out in Regent's Park in place of the Royal Botanic Society's gardens.
  - The Jewish Museum London is founded.
- 1933
  - January: The London Underground diagram designed by Harry Beck is introduced to public.
  - 9 January: George Orwell's Down and Out in Paris and London is published.
  - 10 January: Eric Coates' orchestral London Suite is premiered, with its sequel, London Again Suite, premiering in 1936.
  - 13 March: Another of Charles Holden's masterpieces, Southgate station on the Piccadilly line, opens to the public.
  - 1 July: The London Passenger Transport Board begins operation, taking over operation of all buses, trams and Underground railways in the Greater London area, with Lord Ashfield as chairman and Frank Pick as vice-chairman and chief executive officer.
  - 3 July: New Chiswick Bridge, Twickenham Bridge and Hampton Court Bridge over the Thames are officially opened.
  - 19 July: The new Freemasons' Hall (Masonic Peace Memorial) opens on Great Queen Street.
  - Battersea Power Station begins operation.
  - The new store for Derry & Toms opens on Kensington High Street.
- 1934
  - 9 March: Labour's Herbert Morrison becomes the Leader of the London County Council.
  - 31 May: Hendon Police College is opened for the Metropolitan Police.
  - 23 July: Tower Beach is opened adjacent to the Tower of London.
  - 13 September: The Silvertown Way flyover is opened.
  - 19 September: Mitcham becomes a borough.
  - 12 December: Queen Mary College incorporated under this name in East London.
  - The following key examples of modern architecture are built: Penguin Pool, London Zoo, designed by Berthold Lubetkin and Ove Arup (completed in May), and Isokon building (Lawn Road flats), Hampstead, designed by Wells Coates (9 July). Also, the terraced houses in Genesta Road, Plumstead designed by Lubetkin are completed and 35 houses are built as part of a 'Modern Homes' exhibition in Gidea Park.
  - Harrow Garden Village is completed by the Metropolitan Railway Country Estates.
  - P. L. Travers' children's story Mary Poppins is first published.
- 1935
  - January: The London County Council launches a green belt scheme.
  - 3 July: The Geological Museum opens in a new building in Exhibition Road, South Kensington.
  - 13 July: The London County Council's Becontree estate, the largest housing estate in the world, is officially completed, consisting of some 27,000 new council houses, which are home to more than 100,000 people. This is marked by the opening of Parsloes Park. The first families had moved to the estate, which straddles the borders of Dagenham, Barking and Ilford, in 1921.
  - 30 September: The Municipal Borough of Bexley is chartered.
  - The following further notable examples of modern architecture are completed: Hornsey Town Hall, by Reginald Uren; Highpoint I flats, Highgate, by Lubetkin and Arup; and houses in Kerry Avenue, Stanmore.
- 1936
  - 6 June: The Beehive, Gatwick Airport terminal opens in West Sussex.
  - 7 July: The Imperial War Museum opens in the adapted buildings of Bethlem Royal Hospital in Geraldine Mary Harmsworth Park, Southwark.
  - 16 July: George McMahon makes a botched attempt to shoot King Edward VIII after the Trooping the Colour ceremony.
  - 4 October: The Battle of Cable Street takes place in the East End between Oswald Mosley's British Union of Fascists and anti-fascist demonstrators.
  - 13 October: The Night Ferry railway service is inaugurated between Paris and London, serving Victoria station (until 1980).
  - 31 October: The Jarrow March of 207 miners from Jarrow arrive in London on a protest against unemployment and poverty.
  - 2 November: The BBC launch the world's first regular "high definition" television service, broadcast from Alexandra Palace.
  - 30 November: The Crystal Palace is destroyed in a fire.
  - 9 December: A KLM (Netherlands airline) Douglas DC-2 airliner crashes in Purley shortly after takeoff from Croydon Airport, killing 14 passengers, including Juan de la Cierva and Arvid Lindman with just 2 survivors.
  - The new Peter Jones (department store) opens in Sloane Square.
  - The Adelphi Buildings are demolished; the replacement Art Deco building is completed in 1938.
  - The Geographers' Map Co.'s first A to Z Atlas and Guide to London and the Suburbs is published.
- 1937
  - 20 April: The Granada Cinema, Woolwich, opens.
  - 27 April: The National Maritime Museum opens in Greenwich on the former Royal Hospital School premises.
  - 1–27 May: London's busmen go on strike.
  - 6 May: The replacement Chelsea Bridge opens.
  - 12 May: The Coronation of King George VI and Queen Elizabeth takes place in Westminster Abbey.
  - 28 August: The London Underground's Morden–Edgware line is renamed the Northern line.
  - 1 September: The Earls Court Exhibition Centre opens.
  - October:
    - Senate House (University of London), designed by Charles Holden, is completed.
    - Formation of the Euston Road School, a private School of Drawing and Painting originally established in Fitzroy Street by William Coldstream, Claude Rogers and Victor Pasmore; it gives name to the group of naturalist artists associated with it.
  - October–December: Croydon typhoid outbreak of 1937: 341 cases of typhoid fever, of which 43 are fatal, resulting from a polluted well in Addington.
  - 16 December: The musical Me and My Girl opens in the West End Victoria Palace Theatre; the dance number "The Lambeth Walk" becomes popular.
  - December: The Hawker Hurricane enters service with the Royal Air Force (RAF) as its first monoplane fighter aircraft with No. 111 Squadron at Northolt.
  - The Dolphin Square flats are completed.
  - Kensal House in Ladbroke Grove, two low-rise blocks of modernist flats for the working class commissioned by the Gas Light and Coke Company and designed by Maxwell Fry, are completed as a prototype for modern urban living.
- 1938
  - 6 January: The psychoanalyst Sigmund Freud arrives in London having fled from Vienna.
  - 6 April: The 1938 City of London by-election is held.
  - June: The London Green Belt is placed on a statutory basis by the Green Belts (London & Home Counties) Act.
  - 2 June: The children's zoo at London Zoo is opened by Robert and Ted Kennedy, 2 of the sons of new United States ambassador Joseph P. Kennedy Sr.
  - 30 June: The London Underground's 1938 Stock enters public service on the Northern line. By the time the last examples are withdrawn from the Isle of Wight's Island Line on 3 January 2021, it will be the oldest non-heritage rolling stock operating in the UK.
  - July: The RT type bus enters trial public service in London.
  - 20 August: Parliament Hill Lido opens.
  - 30 September: The Prime Minister Neville Chamberlain returns to the UK from Munich at Heston Aerodrome memorably waving the resolution signed the day earlier with Germany. He later gives his famous Peace for our time speech from Downing Street. George VI and Queen Elizabeth appear with Chamberlain on the balcony of Buckingham Palace to celebrate the agreement.
  - 2 December: First Kindertransport from Berlin arrives at Liverpool Street station.
- 1939
  - January/February: Poetry London: a Bi-Monthly of Modern Verse and Criticism, founded and edited by Tambimuttu with Dylan Thomas and others, is first published.
  - 3 February: The Irish Republican Army (IRA) bombs 2 London Underground stations, Tottenham Court Road and Leicester Square as part of its S-Plan campaign, injuring seven, two seriously.
  - 25 February: The first Anderson shelter is built in London.
  - 29 March: IRA bombs explode on Hammersmith Bridge, causing its closure to traffic for a month.
  - 24 June: IRA bombs explode at London bank branches; there are calls for the release of those arrested in connection with the S-Plan campaign.
  - 26 July: IRA bombs explode at London King's Cross and Victoria stations causing severe injuries and one death.
  - 9 August: The London Passenger Transport Board introduces the first AEC Regent III RT bus into service.
  - 27 August: The Cabinet War Rooms are operational.
  - late August: Most of the paintings in the National Gallery are evacuated to Wales.
  - 1 September: "Operation Pied Piper", the 4-day evacuation of children, begins and central London hospitals are evacuated.
  - 3 September: War is declared by the United Kingdom on Nazi Germany, which begins World War II. Shortly after 11.00, Chamberlain announces this news on BBC Radio, speaking from 10 Downing Street. 20 minutes later, air raid sirens sound in London, but it is a false alarm. Parliament has a rare Sunday sitting.
  - 29 September: London population as recorded in the national register of citizens reaches 8,615,254, a figure which will not be exceeded this century.
  - September–December: The Tower of London serves as a general prisoner of war collection centre.
  - The large London County Council estate of flats in White City is completed.

== 1940 to 1949 ==
- 1940
  - 5 February: The 1940 City of London by-election is held.
  - 18 March: The last terrorist bomb in the Irish Republican Army's S-Plan campaign on the British mainland (and until 1973) explodes harmlessly on a London rubbish dump (the penultimate had exploded the previous day near Paddington Town Hall).
  - 24 August: The first air raid of the war strikes London.
  - 7 September: The Blitz begins with "Black Saturday" bombing of the city by the Luftwaffe, the first of 57 consecutive nights of strategic bombing.
  - 10 September: South Hallsville School (evacuation centre) bombing in Canning Town: at least 77 people, and perhaps 4 times as many, are killed.
  - 13 September: Bombing damages Buckingham Palace and destroys the chapel, but the King and Queen survive without injury and inspect the damage.
  - 15 September: Battle of Britain Day, the climax of the Battle of Britain, in which the Royal Air Force (RAF) resists a mass bombing attack by the Luftwaffe in the skies over London and south east England. Pilot officer Ray Holmes uses his Hawker Hurricane to ram a Dornier Do 17 bomber, causing it to crash on Victoria station.
  - 25 September: The replacement steel Wandsworth Bridge opens across the Thames.
  - Autumn: The War Cabinet begins meeting at the disused Down Street tube station.
  - 13 October: 19 people, mostly Belgian refugees, are killed when a German bomb penetrates Bounds Green station on the Underground, which is being used as an air-raid shelter
  - 14 October: At least 66 people are killed when a German bomb penetrates Balham station on the Underground, which is being used as an air-raid shelter. A double-decker bus falls into the crater.
  - 15 October: Dame Alice Owen's School bombing: around 150 people sheltering in a basement are killed, chiefly through flooding from the New River.
  - 9 November: Church of All Hallows, Twickenham, a partial reconstruction of Christopher Wren's All Hallows Lombard Street (1694–1937), is consecrated.
  - November–March 1942: Tube tunnels built for the Central line's eastern extension are converted into aircraft component factories for Plessey.
  - 29–30 December: The Second Great Fire of London is caused by bombing. More than 160 people and 14 firemen are killed. The Guildhall, St Lawrence Jewry and St Bride's Church are among many buildings badly damaged or destroyed, and the famous photograph St Paul's Survives is taken this morning.
  - The name of the area known as Fitzrovia is first recorded.
- 1941
  - 11 January: At least 56 people are killed when a German bomb hits Bank Underground station, leaving a large crater in the road at Bank junction.
  - 8 March: At least 34 people are killed when a German bomb hits the Café de Paris nightclub.
  - 16–17 April: Serious bomb damage to railway routes across the Thames, the Metropolitan line, the north transept of St Paul's Cathedral and Chelsea Old Church; and Lord Stamp is among those killed.
  - 18 April: Heaviest air-raid of the year on London.
  - 10–12 May: Bombing guts many notable buildings in London, including the Commons Chamber of the Houses of Parliament, which causes its debates to be relocated to the Lords Chamber; the Queen's Hall, which causes The Proms to be relocated to the Royal Albert Hall; and the Great Synagogue of London, St Clement Danes and St Mary-le-Bow. Westminster Abbey's roof is badly damaged and 250,000 books are lost in a fire at the British Museum. The intensive period of The Blitz now ends, leaving around 25,000 people dead in London.
  - 17–21 May: Rudolf Hess is detained in the Tower of London, making him the last official state prisoner to be held here.
  - Spring: Noël Coward composes the song "London Pride".
  - August: Patrick Hamilton's darkly comic eve-of-war novel Hangover Square: a tale of darkest Earl's Court is published.
  - 15 August: Josef Jakobs, who parachuted into England as a German spy, is shot by a military firing squad at the Tower of London, making him the last person to be executed here.
- 1942
  - January: The MARS Group plan for postwar London is published.
  - 9–12 February: Gordon Cummins murders and mutilates 4 women in the blackout, for which he will be hanged at Wandsworth Prison on 25 June during an air raid.
  - 11 August: Traffic is admitted onto the new Waterloo Bridge across the Thames.
- 1943
  - 17 January: Anti-aircraft shrapnel shells kill 23 people and injure 60 people during a raid on London by 118 planes, of which 6 are reported losses.
  - 20 January: Sandhurst Road School Disaster: a bomb kills 38 children and 6 teachers at a school in Catford.
  - 3 March: Bethnal Green tube station disaster: 173 would-be shelterers are crushed to death in a panic.
  - July: The County of London Plan, prepared by J. H. Forshaw and Patrick Abercrombie to guide the London County Council in postwar reconstruction, is published.
  - August: John Christie begins his serial killings at 10 Rillington Place, Notting Hill.
- 1944
  - 21–22 January: Operation Steinbock (the "Baby Blitz"), a nocturnal Luftwaffe bombing offensive chiefly targeted at the Greater London area (continues until May), starts, but on the first attack, few aircraft reach the target area.
  - 26 February: The last heavy air-raids by conventional aircraft take place in London.
  - 13 June: The first V-1 flying bomb attack on London takes place, and 8 civilians are killed when one lands in Grove Road, Hackney. The bomb earns the nickname "doodlebug".
  - 18 June: A V-1 flying bomb hits the Guards Chapel, Wellington Barracks, killing 121 people.
  - July: Deep-level shelters that were built in 1941–2 are opened to the public.
  - 12 August: The V-1 flying bomb campaign against London by the Germans reaches its 60th day, with more than 6,000 deaths, 17,000 injuries and damage or destruction to around 1,000,000 buildings.
  - 8 September: The first V-2 rocket attack (launched from The Hague) strikes London, where it strikes in the Chiswick district and resulting in the deaths of 3 people.
  - October: The "Cleft chin murder": U.S. Army deserter Karl Hulten and 18-year-old Welsh-born waitress Elizabeth Jones go on a 6-day crime spree including the murder of a taxi driver, for which Hulten will be hanged at Pentonville Prison.
  - 25 November: A V-2 rocket destroys the Woolworths store in New Cross Road and kills 168 people, the highest death toll from one of these weapons. More than 100 people survive with injuries.
  - 14 December: Town planner Patrick Abercrombie publishes the Greater London Plan.
  - The Ministry of Works builds the first demonstration prefabs, designed to provide temporary postwar housing, in Northolt; another is exhibited in the summer outside the Tate Gallery on Millbank.
  - Hubert Gregg composes the song "Maybe It's Because I'm a Londoner".
- 1945
  - 8 March: A V-2 rocket hits Smithfield Market and kills 110 people.
  - 27 March: Last day of V-2 rocket attacks on London. One hits Hughes Mansions, Stepney and kills 134 people and the last falls in Orpington with 1 fatality.
  - April: Sybil Campbell is appointed as a stipendiary magistrate in London, making her the first woman to become a professional judge in the UK.
  - 8 May: V-E Day. Crowds in London celebrate the end of World War II in Europe.
  - 17 July: Alexander, Crown Prince of Yugoslavia, is born in Claridge's hotel.
  - 26 July: 1945 United Kingdom general election (5 July) results declared. As part of a national landslide, Labour take 21 London constituencies from the Conservatives.
  - July: London women begin to campaign against the necessity to queue for goods in short supply.
  - 15 August: V-J Day. Crowds in London celebrate the end of World War II.
  - 2 October: London Underground introduces fluorescent lighting on the westbound Piccadilly line platforms at Piccadilly Circus.
- 1946
  - 1 January: The first international flight from London Heathrow Airport takes off. On 31 May, it opens fully for civilian use.
  - 10 January: The first United Nations General Assembly convenes at Methodist Central Hall, Westminster. On 17 January, the United Nations Security Council holds its first meeting at Church House.
  - 20 February: The Royal Opera House in Covent Garden re-opens after the War, with The Royal Ballet, which has relocated from Sadler's Wells Theatre, performing The Sleeping Beauty.
  - 8 June: The London Victory Celebrations take place.
  - 8 September: Mass squat by homeless families of the Ivanhoe Hotel and other empty properties in London, organised by the Communist Party.
  - 9 November: The murder of Margaret Cook takes place in Carnaby Street. A confession to the shooting takes place in 2015.
  - 11 November: Stevenage, a village in Hertfordshire, is designated by the government as Britain's first new town to relieve overcrowding and replace bombed homes in London.
  - 4 December: The Central line (London Underground) is extended from Liverpool Street to Stratford.
  - 19 December: A Railway Air Services Douglas DC-3 taking off from RAF Northholt crashes into 46 Angus Drive, Ruislip, after icing of the wings, but there are no injuries.
  - The development of Churchill Gardens housing estate in Pimlico by Westminster City Council, to the design of Powell and Moya, begins construction.
  - Garnett College opens for the training of further and higher education lecturers; it ultimately becomes a constituent of the University of Greenwich.
- 1947
  - 23 February: Ealing Studios release the film Hue and Cry, filmed largely on location in London and regarded as the first of the Ealing Comedies.
  - 5 May: The Central line is extended from Stratford to Leytonstone.
  - 15 May: London Philharmonic Choir makes its debut, at the Royal Albert Hall.
  - 5 November: Guy the Gorilla arrives at London Zoo.
  - 20 November: Wedding of Princess Elizabeth and Philip Mountbatten, Duke of Edinburgh: Princess Elizabeth (later Queen Elizabeth II, and the daughter of George VI) marries The Duke of Edinburgh at Westminster Abbey.
  - December: The tradition of a Christmas tree donated by Norway for Trafalgar Square begins.
  - The last horse-drawn hackney carriage operates in London.
- 1948
  - 1 January: London's Underground, buses and trams come under control of the London Transport Executive while mainline railways become part of British Railways as part of the nationalisation of the UK's public transport under overall management of the British Transport Commission.
  - 12 January: The London Co-operative Society opens Britain's first supermarket in Manor Park. In the same month, Marks & Spencer introduce self-service in the food department of their Wood Green store.
  - 1 April: The London Electricity Board takes up its powers as part of the nationalisation of the electricity supply industry under terms of the Electricity Act 1947.
  - June
    - The Austin FX3 taxi is launched.
    - Professor Lillian Penson becomes the first woman to serve as a Vice-Chancellor of a British university at the University of London.
  - 4 July: 1948 Northwood mid-air collision: a Scandinavian Airlines Douglas DC-6 and an Avro York of No. 99 Squadron RAF collide over Northwood and crash, killing all 39 people aboard both aircraft.
  - 29 July–14 August: The 1948 Summer Olympics, originally scheduled for 1944, are held, based at Wembley Stadium.
  - 7 November: The Metropolitan Water Board's King George VI Reservoir near Staines in Middlesex is filled and opened.
  - 21 November: The Central line is extended to Woodford–Woodford via the Fairlop Loop, Greenford station, and West Ruislip station.
  - December
    - Sloop HMS Wellington (1934) is permanently moored on the Thames alongside the Victoria Embankment as the headquarters ship of the Honourable Company of Master Mariners.
    - Smog kills 700–800.
  - The London County Council begins the development of the Harold Hill estate, and Span Developments begin their first housing development, Oaklands in Whitton.
  - The Colony Room Club, a private members' drinking club at 41 Dean Street, Soho, is founded and presided over by Muriel Belcher. The painter Francis Bacon becomes a member the day after it opens, which establishes it as a centre for the city's alcoholic artistic elite.
- 1949
  - Early: The Spa Green Estate in Clerkenwell, designed by Berthold Lubetkin of the Tecton Group as a model for postwar public housing, is completed.
  - 26 April: The Ealing Comedy film Passport to Pimlico is premièred in London.
  - 10 May: The UK's first self-service launderette opens on Queensway.
  - 6 July: The London Transport Executive opens the bus stand at Newbury Park tube station.
  - 27 November: Brumas becomes the first polar bear born at London Zoo.
  - Construction of the Woodberry Down estate by the London County Council begins.

== 1950 to 1959 ==
- 1950
  - 9 March: Timothy Evans is hanged at HM Prison Pentonville for the murder of his baby daughter and, by imputation, his wife at their residence at 10 Rillington Place in Notting Hill. 3 years later, his downstairs neighbour John Christie is found to be a serial killer of at least 7 women at this address, for which he is also hanged at Pentonville, with Evans being posthumously pardoned in 1966.
  - 31 July: Sainsbury's opens the first purpose-built supermarket, at Croydon.
  - 30 September: The London Transport Executive begins the closure of the trams in London.
  - 26 October: The Commons Chamber of the Houses of Parliament is reopened to MPs after the restoration work (following war damage) by Sir Giles Gilbert Scott is completed.
  - 25 December: The Stone of Scone is stolen from Westminster Abbey by a group of 4 Scottish students. It is recovered the following year.
  - The UK Parliament constituency of the Cities of London and Westminster is created, which ends the separate City of London constituency that has existed since 1298.
  - The Metropolitan Borough of St Pancras flats in St Pancras Way are completed, and the Pimlico District Heating Undertaking begins operation.
- 1951
  - 6 April: The last trams operate through the Kingsway tramway subway.
  - 8 April: London's population has declined to 3,348,336 in the county and 8,346,137 in Greater London.
  - 3 May–30 September: The Festival of Britain takes place on the South Bank, which includes the Royal Festival Hall, Dome of Discovery and Skylon. Pleasure Gardens and a Fun Fair are opened in Battersea Park, and the Lansbury Estate in Poplar is begun this year as a housing showcase.
  - 11 June: The London Transport Executive introduces a Circular Tour of London using double-decker buses for the Festival.
  - 15 June: The Ealing Comedy film The Lavender Hill Mob is released.
  - 15 August: The first Miss World beauty pageant is held as the 'Festival Bikini Contest'.
  - 4 September: The William Girling Reservoir is opened in the Lee Valley Reservoir Chain by the Metropolitan Water Board.
  - 3 November: Express Dairies open Britain's first full-size supermarket in Streatham Hill.
  - December: John Wyndham's novel The Day of the Triffids, which opens in a post-apocalyptic London, is published.
- 1952
  - 7 February: The new Queen Elizabeth II and Prince Philip, Duke of Edinburgh return to London from their tour in Kenya after the death of George VI.
  - April: The London Transport Executive opens Stockwell Garage, which has Europe's largest unsupported roof span at this date.
  - 21 May: The Eastcastle Street robbery takes place, in which a post office van is held up in the West End and £287,000 stolen, making it Britain's largest postwar robbery up to this date; the robbers are never caught.
  - 15 June: The Polish secret agent Krystyna Skarbek is murdered at the Shelbourne Hotel in Earl's Court.
  - 5 July: The last of the original trams in London operates, and the citizens of London turn out in force to say farewell.
  - 8 October: Harrow and Wealdstone rail crash, a multiple collision which claims the lives of 112 people.
  - November: The new Bankside Power Station is commissioned. Also this year, Brunswick Wharf Power Station in Blackwall begins to generate electricity.
  - 25 November: Agatha Christie's play The Mousetrap starts its run at the New Ambassadors Theatre. It will still be running in London as of 2022, having transferred next door to St Martin's Theatre in 1974.
  - 4–9 December: The Great Smog blankets London, causing transport chaos and, it is believed, around 4,000 deaths.
  - 30 December: Tower Bridge's bascules are raised as a London Transport bus crosses, and the driver, Albert Gunter, is awarded £10 (£290 in 2022) and a day off for his bravery.
- 1953
  - 8 April: 12 people are killed in the Stratford tube crash, making this the first major accident on the Tube with passenger fatalities.
  - 2 June: The Coronation of Queen Elizabeth II takes place in Westminster Abbey.
  - ca. June: Kieran Kelly begins his career as the serial killer of at least 16 men between now and 1983, mostly by pushing them under London Underground trains.
  - Civil Service Club founded.
  - The Moka on Frith Street, Soho is the first Italian espresso coffee bar to open in the UK.
  - 1st century Roman leather bikini briefs are found in Queen Street in the city.
- 1954
  - September: Kidbrooke School in Greenwich opens as England's first purpose-built comprehensive school.
  - 18 September: The marble head of Mithras from the London Mithraeum is unearthed in Walbrook Square.
  - 10 December: The tea clipper Cutty Sark (1869) is towed into a permanent dry dock in Greenwich for preservation.
  - The first UK Wimpy Bar opens at the Lyons Corner House on Coventry Street.
  - Span Developments begin the development of the Cator Estate in Blackheath.
- 1955
  - 13 July: Ruth Ellis becomes the last woman to be hanged in the UK at HM Prison Holloway for shooting dead a lover, David Blakely, outside a pub in Hampstead on 10 April (Easter Sunday).
  - 22 September: The first Independent Television franchise covering London, Associated-Rediffusion, begins broadcasting from Croydon transmitting station.
  - 2 December: Barnes rail crash: a collision due to a signal error and consequent fire kills 13 people with another 35 people injured.
  - 8 December: The Ealing Comedy film The Ladykillers, set around King's Cross, is released.
  - 16 December: The new terminal at London Airport is opened by The Queen.
- Mary Quant opens her first fashion boutique, Bazaar, in the King's Road, Chelsea.
- 1956
  - January: Battersea Poltergeist first manifests.
  - 24 January: Plans are announced for the construction of thousands of new homes in the Barbican area, which was devastated by the Luftwaffe during World War II.
  - 8 February: London Transport introduces the first (experimental) AEC Routemaster double-deck bus into public service, on route 2. At the 9 November Lord Mayor's Show it forms part of the procession, where it is advertised as "London's Bus Of The Future".
  - 14 March: A memorial to Karl Marx is unveiled at the new site of his grave in Highgate Cemetery by Harry Pollitt, General Secretary of the Communist Party of Great Britain.
  - 28 March: The Crystal Palace transmitting station is brought into use for BBC Television. From its erection until around 1990 its mast is the tallest structure in London.
  - 22 April: The 2i's Coffee Bar opens in Old Compton Street, Soho; its basement rapidly becomes a pioneering venue for rock and roll music in Britain.
  - 21 May: 24-hour fire in the former Goodge Street deep-level shelter.
  - 5 July: Parliament passes the Clean Air Act in response to the Great Smog of 1952.
  - December: Smog kills around 1000 people.
  - The Leo Baeck College, the first Jewish seminary for Liberal and Reform Judaism in England, opens as the Jewish Theological College of London at West London Synagogue, and its first 2 students are Lionel Blue and Michael Leigh.
  - Pollock's Toy Museum is established.
- 1957
  - 13 June: Oxford Street bus accident: 8 people are killed when a double-decker collides with a queue.
  - 4 December: Lewisham rail crash on the Southern Region of British Railways: 90 people are killed in a rear-end collision in fog and bridge collapse.
  - 19 December: St Bride's Church is reconsecrated in the presence of The Queen.
  - The first stage of Golden Lane Estate in Finsbury, designed by Chamberlin, Powell and Bon, is officially opened, and Great Arthur House is briefly the tallest residential building in Britain at the time of construction.
  - Michael Young and Peter Willmott's sociological study Family and Kinship in East London is published.
- 1958
  - 30 January: The Dagenham East rail crash takes place in the Eastern Region of British Railways, in which 10 people are killed in a rear-end collision in fog.
  - 21 March: The London Planetarium, the first in Britain, opens.
  - 19 April: The Marquee Club first opens as a jazz venue.
  - 5 May–19 June: A London bus crew strike takes place.
  - 9 June: Gatwick Airport opens in West Sussex.
  - 10 June: The City of Westminster installs the first regular parking meters in Grosvenor Square following an experimental installation in 1956. Double yellow lines are also introduced in the Metropolitan Police District during the year.
  - 26 July: The presentation of débutantes to the royal court is abolished.
  - 30 August–5 September: The 1958 Notting Hill race riots take place.
  - 26 September: The Austin FX4 taxi is launched.
  - 13 October: Michael Bond's children's story A Bear Called Paddington, introducing the character Paddington Bear, is published.
  - His Clothes is the first boutique to be opened by John Stephen in Carnaby Street.
  - The new store for Barkers of Kensington, which had begun construction in the 1930s, is completed.
- 1959
  - January
    - Ealing Jazz Club opens.
    - The first Caribbean carnival in Britain is staged at St Pancras Town Hall by Claudia Jones.
  - 6 April: The subscriber trunk dialling telephone code 01 is allocated to London.
  - 23 April: London Heliport opens adjacent to the Thames in Battersea.
  - 28 May: The Mermaid Theatre opens in the City of London.
  - 30 September
    - The Chiswick flyover is opened by Jayne Mansfield.
    - The last flights take off from Croydon Aerodrome.
  - 12 October: Large-scale diamond robbery in London.
  - 17 October: The London County Council opens Park Lane Underpass.
  - 30 October: Ronnie Scott's Jazz Club opens in Soho.
  - 11 November: London Transport introduces the production AEC Routemaster double-deck bus into full public service.
  - Bracken House, the Financial Times headquarters in the City of London designed by Sir Albert Richardson, is completed.
  - The London County Council completes the first portion of Alton Estate in Roehampton, considered a model of post-war public housing.
  - London Pride (beer) is first produced at Fuller's Brewery in Chiswick.
  - Colin MacInnes' novel Absolute Beginners is published.

== 1960 to 1969 ==
- 1960
  - 18 April: 60,000 protestors stage a demonstration in London against nuclear weapons.
  - 15 September: The first traffic wardens are deployed in London.
  - 27 September: Travolator inclined moving walkway installed at Bank station.
  - September: The Metropolitan Water Board's Thames–Lea Valley Aqueduct is inaugurated.
  - The Embassy of the United States London Chancery Building, designed by Eero Saarinen, opens in Grosvenor Square on land leased from the Grosvenor Estate in Mayfair.
  - Eurovision Song Contest 1960 held.
- 1961
  - 6 July: The last judicial execution at HM Prison Pentonville takes place for 21-year-old Edwin Bush, who is hanged by Harry Allen for the stabbing of Elsie Batten in an antique shop in Cecil Court on 3 March. He is also the first British criminal caught through the Identikit facial composite system.
  - 8 September: The last judicial execution in London takes place for Henryk Niemasz, who is hanged at HM Prison Wandsworth by Harry Allen for double murder.
  - 16 November: The Hammersmith flyover opens.
  - December: The demolition of the Euston Arch begins; much of the stone is used for repairs to the Prescott Channel.
  - The Empress State Building is completed on the site of the Empress Hall in West Brompton.
- 1962
  - May: Joe Orton and Kenneth Halliwell are prosecuted and jailed for defacing Islington library books.
  - 8 May: The last trolleybuses in London run.
  - 6 June: The Beatles play their first session at Abbey Road Studios.
  - 1 July: A heavy smog develops over London.
  - 12 July: The Rolling Stones play their first gig at the Marquee Club in Oxford Street. From February 1963, they get a residency at the Crawdaddy Club in Richmond.
  - 31 July: A crowd assaults a rally of the right-wing Union Movement of Sir Oswald Mosley.
  - 10 October: The former Anglican church of All Saints in Knightsbridge (1849) is elevated to be the Cathedral of the Dormition of the Mother of God and All Saints of the Russian Orthodox Diocese of Sourozh.
  - 6 November: The new building for the Commonwealth Institute opens in Kensington.
  - 2–7 December: A severe smog in London causes numerous deaths.
  - Queen's Gallery opens.
- 1963
  - 11 February: American-born poet Sylvia Plath commits suicide by carbon monoxide poisoning in her London flat at age 30.
  - 19 March: Joan Littlewood's Theatre Workshop premières the ensemble musical play Oh, What a Lovely War! at the Theatre Royal Stratford East.
  - 16 May: The London Tourist Board is established.
  - 31 July: London Government Act 1963 passed.
  - 22 October: The National Theatre Company, newly formed under artistic director Laurence Olivier, gives its first performance with Peter O'Toole as Hamlet at The Old Vic.
  - 23 November: The design of the London police box is first used as the inspiration for the design of the TARDIS in the BBC television series Doctor Who. It is still used into the 21st century, albeit with a modified design.
  - The Millbank Tower is completed as a headquarters for Vickers.
  - Eurovision Song Contest 1963 held.
  - The construction of the Aylesbury Estate begins in Walworth by the London Borough of Southwark.
  - Nell Dunn's short story collection Up the Junction is published; a film adaptation is released in 1968.
- 1964
  - 21 January: The Strand Underpass opens using part of the former Kingsway tramway subway.
  - 2 February: The Hammersmith nude murders case begins when the first of 6 definite prostitute victims of an unknown serial killer, "Jack the Stripper", is found.
  - 5 September: Biba opens its first store in Kensington.
  - 4 November: The automaton clock over the main entrance of Fortnum & Mason's grocery store is inaugurated.
  - 5 December: There is a major fire in Bishopsgate railway goods depot.
  - 23 December: The "Pirate" radio station Radio London begins broadcasting from MV Galaxy, anchored outside British territorial waters off Frinton, Essex.
  - December: The London Record Society is founded as a text publication society.
- 1965
  - 7 January: The Kray Twins are arrested on suspicion of running a protection racket.
  - 30 January: The State funeral procession of Winston Churchill takes place.
  - 11 March: Goldie the Eagle is recaptured 13 days after escaping from London Zoo.
  - 1 April: Local government in London is reorganised. The Greater London Council (GLC) comes into its powers, replacing the London County Council and greatly expanding the metropolitan area of the city. Labour have an elected majority. The county of Middlesex is abolished as an administrative district with most being incorporated into the GLC area (except Staines and Sunbury transferred to Surrey, and Potters Bar transferred to Hertfordshire). London Ambulance Service and Greater London Record Office established.
    - The following inner London boroughs are created: Camden, Greenwich, Hackney, Hammersmith and Fulham, Islington, Kensington and Chelsea, Lambeth, Lewisham, Southwark, Tower Hamlets, Wandsworth, and Westminster (the latter incorporating the Metropolitan Boroughs of Paddington and St Marylebone). Inner London Education Authority takes responsibility for schools in these areas.
    - The following outer London boroughs are created: Barking and Dagenham, Barnet, Bexley, Brent, Bromley, Croydon, Ealing, Enfield, Haringey, Harrow, Havering, Hillingdon, Hounslow, Kingston upon Thames, Merton, Newham, Redbridge, Richmond upon Thames, Sutton, and Waltham Forest.
  - 8 July: The Great Train Robber Ronnie Biggs escapes from Wandsworth Prison.
  - 24 July: Freddie Mills, former British boxing champion, is found shot in his car in Soho, dying of his injuries the next day.
  - 8 October: The Post Office Tower officially opens as a telecommunications hub.
  - 4 November: The 1965 Cities of London and Westminster by-election is held.
  - Mary Quant introduces the miniskirt from her shop Bazaar on the Kings Road in Chelsea.
- 1966
  - February: Granny Takes a Trip is opened on King's Road, Chelsea by Nigel Waymouth, Sheila Cohen and John Pearse, and is claimed as the first psychedelic boutique in London.
  - 8 March
    - The City University London is chartered.
    - The London Free School is established.
  - 9 March: Ronnie, one of the Kray twins, shoots George Cornell, an associate of rivals The Richardson Gang, dead at The Blind Beggar pub in Whitechapel, a crime for which he is finally convicted in 1969.
  - 27 March: 1966 theft of the Jules Rimet Trophy: Pickles, a mongrel dog, finds the FIFA World Cup Trophy, stolen 7 days earlier from an exhibition, wrapped in newspaper in a south London garden.
  - 15 April: The Time magazine uses the phrase "Swinging London".
  - 9 June: Brunel University is chartered in Uxbridge.
  - July: The Playboy Club and casino opens in Park Lane.
  - 30 July: The FIFA World Cup Final is held at Wembley Stadium between England and West Germany. England wins the trophy which had been recovered in March.
  - 12 August: Shepherd's Bush murders: 3 policemen are shot dead in Braybrook Street, Shepherd's Bush.
  - 22 August: Centre Point, a 32-floor office building at St Giles Circus designed by Richard Seifert for property speculator Harry Hyams, is completed. It remains empty for around a decade; between 2015 and 2018 it is converted into luxury apartments.
  - 22 October: British double agent George Blake escapes from Wormwood Scrubs prison; he is next seen in Moscow.
  - 18 September: Notting Hill Fayre and Pageant, initiated by Rhaune Laslett, opens, predecessor of Notting Hill Carnival.
  - 23 December: The UFO Club, part of the UK underground scene, opens in a Tottenham Court Road basement.
  - 31 December: Thieves steal 8 paintings worth millions of pounds from Dulwich Art Gallery; they are all recovered locally within a week.
  - The Greater London Council (GLC) proposes the construction of the Ringway 1, the inner city "Motorway Box".
  - 1966–January 1970: The introduction of all-figure dialling within the London Director telephone system ends the use of alphabetic exchange names.
- 1967
  - January: The London-set film Blowup is released in the UK.
  - 23 January: Milton Keynes, a village in Buckinghamshire, 50 miles north of London, is formally designated as a new town by the government. It is intended to accommodate overspill population from London.
  - 1 March: The Queen Elizabeth Hall opens as a concert venue on the South Bank.
  - 31 March: The Royal Ordnance Factory closes at the Royal Arsenal, Woolwich.
  - 3 April: Anguillan-born Norwell Roberts becomes the first black officer in the Metropolitan Police Service.
  - 13 April: The Conservative Party wins the Greater London Council elections.
  - 5 May: The Kinks' single "Waterloo Sunset" is released.
  - 20 May: In the first all-London FA Cup final, Tottenham Hotspur defeat Chelsea 2–1 at Wembley Stadium.
  - 9 July: The Southern Region of British Railways operates the last steam locomotives into a London terminus (Waterloo) in regular service.
  - 9 August: 34-year-old playwright Joe Orton is battered to death by his lover Kenneth Halliwell, who then commits suicide, in their Islington home.
  - October–November: Unofficial London dock workers' strike.
  - 5 November: Hither Green rail crash on the Southern Region of British Railways: 49 people are killed in a high-speed derailment.
  - 7 November: St Pancras railway station is made a Grade I listed building, a landmark in the appreciation of Victorian architecture.
  - 5 December: The Beatles open the Apple Shop in Baker Street; it will close on 31 July 1968.
  - The Royal Lancaster Hotel opens at Lancaster Gate.
  - Le Gavroche restaurant opens in Mayfair; it will close in January 2024.
  - St Christopher's Hospice, the world's first purpose-built secular hospice specialising in palliative care of the terminally ill, is established in South London by Cicely Saunders with the support of Albertine Winner.
- 1968
  - 3 January: Heston services fully opens on the M4 motorway.
  - 24 January: Inaugural concert of the London Sinfonietta at the Queen Elizabeth Hall.
  - 17 March: Police and protestors clash at an anti-Vietnam War protest outside the Embassy of the United States in Grosvenor Square, with many people being injured and arrested.
  - 5 April: Hawker Hunter Tower Bridge incident: The 50th anniversary of the RAF occurs without a flypast; as a protest, airman Alan Pollock flies his Hawker Hunter through Tower Bridge, the only time a jet aircraft has flown through the structure.
  - 18 April: The facing stones of the 1831 London Bridge are sold to the American entrepreneur Robert P. McCulloch. He then rebuilds it in Lake Havasu City, Arizona, where it reopens in 1971.
  - 16 May: The Ronan Point tower block in Newham partially collapses following a gas explosion, and 4 people are killed.
  - 30 July: Thames Television takes over the weekday independent television franchise for the London area.
  - 2 August: London Weekend Television takes over the weekend independent television franchise for the London area.
  - 1 September: The London Transport Board opens the first section of Victoria line Tube railway.
  - 30 September: St Katharine Docks is closed to commercial shipping.
  - 14 October: Euston railway station officially reopens after rebuilding.
  - 27 October: The police and protestors clash after an anti-Vietnam War protest outside the Embassy of the United States in Grosvenor Square.
  - The first residence at Thamesmead is occupied; and Balfron Tower, GLC social housing in Poplar designed by Ernő Goldfinger, is completed.
  - Eurovision Song Contest 1968 held at the Royal Albert Hall.
  - Original office block at 20 Fenchurch Street, designed by William H. Rogers, built by Land Securities and occupied by Dresdner Kleinwort; at 91 m (299 ft) tall with 25 storeys it is one of the first tall buildings in the city.
  - The Ukrainian Catholic Cathedral of the Holy Family in Exile is consecrated in the former King's Weigh House Congregational church of 1891 in Mayfair.
- 1969
  - 24 January: Violent protests by students close the London School of Economics, which does not re-open for 3 weeks.
  - 30 January: The Beatles' rooftop concert: The Beatles give their last public performance on the roof of Apple Records in Savile Row.
  - 7 March: London Underground's Victoria line is officially opened between Walthamstow Central and Victoria station by The Queen. The remaining portion of the line to Brixton opens on 23 July 1971.
  - 1 April: SR.N4 hovercraft Princess Margaret travels down the Thames and under Tower Bridge, where it then parks on a floating docking platform, as part of its introduction to service on the cross-channel route from Dover to Calais.
  - 7 May: Christopher Wren's church of St Mary Aldermanbury (1677) is rededicated at Westminster College in Fulton, Missouri.
  - 5 July: The Rolling Stones perform at the free festival The Stones in the Park outdoors in Hyde Park in front of at least 250,000 fans 2 days after the death of their founder Brian Jones.
  - 21 September: The police evict squatters from the London Street Commune.
  - 26 September: Abbey Road features on The Beatles' album cover of the same name.
  - Scratchwood services opens on the M1 motorway.

== 1970 to 1979 ==
- 1970
  - 1 January: The control of London Transport passes from the London Transport Board to the Greater London Council as its London Transport Executive, and London Country Bus Services passes to the National Bus Company.
  - March: The Babes in the Wood murders (Epping Forest) take place.
  - July: Westway opens.
  - 6 July: A major power cut on the London Underground affects 200,000 people, causing them to have to walk through the tunnels to exit the trains.
  - 18 September: Death of Jimi Hendrix: American rock star Jimi Hendrix dies aged 27 at St Mary Abbots Hospital, Kensington from a suspected drug-induced heart attack, two days after last playing in public.
  - 6 October: BBC Radio London begins broadcasting.
  - 27 November: The Gay Liberation Front organises its first march in London.
  - c. 23 December: The last ship leaves the Surrey Commercial Docks.
  - The City of London Polytechnic, North East London Polytechnic and Thames Polytechnic are formed by mergers.
  - The Whitgift Centre shopping centre and office complex are completed in Croydon.
- 1971
  - 1 May: A bomb planted by The Angry Brigade explodes in the Biba Kensington store.
  - 21 May: The Polytechnic of Central London is formed by merger of previous institutions as a successor to the 1838 Polytechnic. Also this year, the Polytechnic of North London is founded by merger of the Northern and North-Western polytechnics.
  - 15 February: Decimal Day sees decimalisation of the UK currency.
  - 6 June: The London Underground operates its last steam locomotives, which were used for maintenance trains.
  - 14 June: The first Hard Rock Cafe opens near Hyde Park Corner.
  - 23 July: The Victoria line's extension to Brixton (excluding Pimlico) is officially opened by Princess Alexandra.
  - 21 October: HMS Belfast (C35) (1939) opens as a museum ship on the Thames.
  - 31 October: A terrorist bomb explodes at the top of the Post Office Tower.
  - 16 December: The trial of the Mangrove Nine, a group of black activists, concludes with them being acquitted of the most serious charge, of incitement to riot at a 1970 protest against police targeting of the Notting Hill Caribbean restaurant The Mangrove. There is also judicial acknowledgement of behaviour motivated by racial hatred within the Metropolitan Police.
- 1972
  - 30 May: 5 children are killed in an accident on the Big Dipper (Battersea Park).
  - 11 June: Eltham Well Hall rail crash: a speeding train derails, killing the driver and 5 passengers.
  - 1 July: The first official national Gay Pride march, origin of Pride London, takes place.
  - 14 September: Pimlico station opens.
  - 8 November: The Stock Exchange Tower opens.
  - Richmond American University London is founded.
  - The Brunswick Centre is completed in Bloomsbury.
  - The Robin Hood Gardens council housing complex is completed in Tower Hamlets.
- 1973
  - 26 February: The Poet laureate John Betjeman's television documentary about the London suburbs, Metro-Land, is broadcast.
  - 3 March: 2 Provisional Irish Republican Army (IRA) bombs explode in London, killing 1 person and injuring 250 others.
  - 8 March: Old Bailey bombing, a further IRA attack, kills 1, with a further explosion in Whitehall.
  - 17 March: The rebuilt London Bridge opens.
  - 26 March: Women are admitted to the London Stock Exchange for the first time.
  - March: The Metropolitan Police abolishes its separate A4 (Women's) division and integrates its female officers.
  - 17 April: Robert Mark is appointed Commissioner of Police of the Metropolis, continuing his efforts to root out corruption in the CID.
  - 6 June: St Mary's Church, Putney is gutted by fire, which is later revealed to be arson.
  - 23 August: An IRA bomb is found at Baker Street station and is defused, making this the first postwar terrorist targeting of the London Underground. On 8 September, the IRA detonates further bombs, at Victoria Station and in Manchester.
  - 10 September
    - IRA bombs at King's Cross and Euston railway stations injure 13 people.
    - The fashion retailer Biba re-opens in the former Derry & Toms store in Kensington High Street.
  - 12 September: Further IRA bombs explode in Oxford Street and Sloane Square.
  - 8 October: LBC begins broadcasting, making it Britain's first independent local radio station.
  - 16 October: Capital Radio begins broadcasting, making it Britain's first legitimate commercial music-based radio station.
  - 20 December: The Ealing Broadway rail crash results in 10 people being killed following a high-speed derailment.
  - Cromwell Tower, the first tower block of the Barbican Estate in the City and at this date London's tallest residential tower at 42 storeys and 123 metres (404 ft) high, is completed.
  - Trellick Tower, GLC social housing in North Kensington designed by Ernő Goldfinger, is completed.
  - Windsor House is built.
  - The Bishop of London moves his official residence from Fulham Palace to The Old Deanery, Dean's Court in the City of London.
  - GSM London is established as the Greenwich School of Management.
- 1974
  - 20 March: Ian Ball fails in his attempt to kidnap Princess Anne and her husband Capt. Mark Phillips in The Mall outside Buckingham Palace.
  - 1 April: Thames Water, set up under the terms of the Water Act 1973, takes over the Metropolitan Water Board and other water suppliers in the Thames catchment as well as management of the Thames above Teddington Lock from the Thames Conservancy. The piers below Staines pass from the Port of London Authority to the Greater London Council.
  - 4 April: A replica of Sir Francis Drake's 'Golden Hinde' sails past Tower Bridge.
  - 27 May: Jill Viner, London Transport's first female bus driver, begins shifts.
  - 15 June: The Red Lion Square disorders see members of the fascist National Front clash with counter-protesters in the West End. 21-year-old Kevin Gateley, a university student, is killed as a result.
  - 17 June: A Provisional Irish Republican Army (IRA) bomb explodes at the Palace of Westminster and damages Westminster Hall. Then on 17 July, an IRA bomb explodes at the White Tower in the Tower of London, killing 1 person and injuring 41 people. Another bomb also explodes outside a government building in south London.
  - 12 October: The first UK McDonald's opens in Woolwich.
  - 22 October: An IRA bomb explodes at Brooks's club. Then on 7 November, an IRA bomb explodes at the Kings Arms, Woolwich, killing 2 people and injuring 28 people.
  - 11 November: The New Covent Garden Market opens at Nine Elms.
  - 22 December: A suspected IRA bomb explodes at the home of Conservative Party leader and former Prime Minister Edward Heath.
  - Sex (boutique) is opened by Malcolm McLaren and Vivienne Westwood on the King's Road.
- 1975
  - 28 February: The Moorgate tube crash takes place: 43 are killed when a Northern line train accelerates into a dead end tunnel on the Highbury Branch.
  - 5 May: St Leonard's Church, Streatham is gutted by fire.
  - 2 June: Snow falls at Lord's cricket ground.
  - July: The Allen Hall Seminary is opened by the Catholic province of Westminster on the site of Thomas More's house in Chelsea.
  - 14 August: The heaviest rainfall is recorded in London, where there is 17.8 cm (7 in.) in just 2 hours in Hampstead.
  - 5 September: A Provisional Irish Republican Army (IRA) bomb explodes at The London Hilton on Park Lane, killing 2 and injuring 63 people.
  - 28 September–3 October: The Spaghetti House siege takes place, during which 9 hostages are taken.
  - 9 October: An IRA bomb explodes outside Green Park tube station, killing 1 person and injuring 20 people.
  - 23 October: The oncologist Gordon Hamilton Fairley is killed by an IRA bomb intended for Sir Hugh Fraser.
  - November: A gold sovereign is the last coin to be minted at the Royal Mint's original London location.
  - 18 November: Walton's Restaurant bombing.
  - 6–12 December: The Balcombe Street siege: 4 members of the IRA take hostages before surrendering to the police.
  - The Southwark Towers are built.
- 1976
  - 29 January: 12 Provisional Irish Republican Army bombs explode in the West End.
  - 2 March: Brent Cross shopping centre opens.
  - 13 April: Whitbread ceases brewing at Chiswell Street.
  - Summer: The heatwave this year sees 16 consecutive days over 30 °C (86 °F).
  - 5 August: Big Ben breaks down after the air brake speed regulator of the chiming mechanism breaks from torsional fatigue, causing the fully wound 4-ton weight to spin the winding drum out of the movement. The clock and bells remain out of action until 1977 and BBC Radio 4 has to broadcast the pips instead.
  - 20 August–14 July 1978: The Grunwick dispute, an industrial dispute involving trade union recognition at the Grunwick film processing Laboratories in Willesden.
  - 25 October: The National Theatre is officially opened on the South Bank.
  - December: The Museum of London is established on London Wall, close to the Barbican Centre.
  - The Wat Buddhapadipa in Wimbledon is the first purpose-built (Thai style) Buddhist temple built in Britain.
- 1977
  - 24 February: The 1977 City of London and Westminster South by-election is held.
  - 10 March: A thanksgiving service is held at Westminster Abbey for the late composer Benjamin Britten.
  - 11 April: London Transport's Silver Jubilee AEC Routemaster buses are launched for the Silver Jubilee of Elizabeth II.
  - 5 May: The 1977 Greater London Council election takes place, and the Conservatives secure a substantial majority over Labour.
  - 9 May: Big Ben resumes chiming after a nine-month shutdown, the longest break in its history.
  - 13 August: "Battle of Lewisham": an attempt by the far-right National Front to march from New Cross to Lewisham leads to counter-demonstrations and violent clashes.
  - 31 August: Enfield poltergeist first manifests.
  - 16 September: Glam rock star Marc Bolan is killed in a car crash in Barnes at age 29.
  - 31 October: "Frestonia" attempts to secede from the UK.
  - 23 November: The new premises for the Public Record Office, later The National Archives, opens in Kew.
  - 16 December: The Piccadilly line is extended to Heathrow Central tube station, making it the first metro system in the world to serve an airport.
  - Eurovision Song Contest 1977 held.
  - London Hydraulic Power Company closes its last pumping station, in Wapping Wall.
  - The Garden Museum is established at the former church of St Mary-at-Lambeth.
  - J. Lyons and Co. closes its last Corner House restaurant.
- 1978
  - 4 May: Altab Ali is murdered in Whitechapel in a racially motivated attack, which mobilises the British Bangladeshi community to protest.
  - 8 June: St Mary's Church, Barnes is gutted by fire.
  - 20 August: Gunmen open fire on an Israeli El Al airline bus in London.
  - 7 September: The Bulgarian dissident Georgi Markov is stabbed with a poison-tipped umbrella as he walks across Waterloo Bridge, probably on orders of his country's intelligence service, and he dies 4 days later.
  - 1 December–13 November 1979: The Times and The Sunday Times newspapers suspend publication over a dispute by journalists.
  - 30 December: The first of at least 12 murders committed by Dennis Nilsen take place in north London.
  - London Borough of Camden low-rise high-density social housing schemes are completed on Alexandra Road Estate (by Neave Brown) and Branch Hill (by Gordon Benson and Alan Forsyth).
  - The Asharq Al-Awsat newspaper begins publication.
- 1979
  - 30 March: Airey Neave, a World War II veteran and Conservative Northern Ireland spokesman, is killed by an Irish National Liberation Army bomb in the House of Commons car park.
  - 7 April: The last RT type bus runs in London.
  - 1 May: The Jubilee line is inaugurated.
  - 5 September: The funeral of Louis Mountbatten, murdered by the IRA in August, takes place at Westminster Abbey.
  - 14 September: The government announces plans to regenerate the London Docklands with housing and commercial developments.
  - 18 October: The new Lyric Theatre in Hammersmith opens, with the first play being George Bernard Shaw's You Never Can Tell.
  - Stepney City Farm is founded.

== 1980 to 1989 ==
- 1980
  - 28 March: The London Transport Museum opens in the former Covent Garden flower market.
  - 30 April–5 May: The Iranian Embassy siege is ended by the intervention of the Special Air Service.
  - 10 July: Alexandra Palace is gutted by fire for the second time in its history.
  - 16 August: 2 nightclubs in Denmark Street are gutted by arson, killing 37 people.
  - 30 October: The last Night Ferry train to Paris departs from London Victoria station.
  - St George's Hospital moves from Hyde Park Corner to Tooting.
  - The London Chinatown Community Centre is established.
  - Royal Society of Chemistry is formed by merger with its headquarters at Burlington House
- 1981
  - 18 January: 10 people are killed in the New Cross house fire, and on 25 January, another victim dies in hospital.
  - 29 March: The London Marathon is run for the first time.
  - 11 April: The 1981 Brixton riot takes place.
  - 20 April: More than 100 people are arrested and 15 police officers are injured in clashes with black youths in the Finsbury Park, Forest Green and Ealing areas.
  - 7 May: Ken Livingstone becomes the leader of the Greater London Council after Labour wins the GLC elections.
  - 11 June: The National Westminster Tower opens.
  - 21 June: There is a fire at Goodge Street tube station.
  - 2 July: The London Docklands Development Corporation (LDDC) is set up.
  - 29 July: The Wedding of Charles, Prince of Wales, and Lady Diana Spencer takes place in St Paul's Cathedral.
  - 4 October: London Transport Executive (GLC) introduces the 'Fares Fair', which sees an average 32% reduction of public transport fares. However, it is declared unlawful on 17 December following legal challenge by London Borough of Bexley.
  - 10 October: Chelsea Barracks is bombed by the Provisional Irish Republican Army, killing 2 people.
  - November: The Port of London Authority closes the Royal Docks, the last functioning upstream docks, to general trade.
  - The Greater London Council public housing stock passes to boroughs.
  - Whiteleys department store in Bayswater closes.
- 1982
  - 4 January: London & South Eastern (L&SE) is created by British Rail to provide London suburban services.
  - 19 January: Billingsgate Fish Market opens on a new site in the Isle of Dogs after having closed its old site in the City 3 days earlier.
  - 3 March: The Barbican Centre opens as an arts and conference venue.
  - 28 May: Pope John Paul II's visit to the United Kingdom begins, and following arrival from Gatwick Airport at Victoria station he attends Mass at Westminster Cathedral. On 29 May, there is an open-air Mass at Wembley Stadium, and on 30 May a meeting at Crystal Palace Stadium with the Polish Catholic community.
  - 3 June: The Israeli ambassador to the UK Shlomo Argov is shot outside the Dorchester Hotel.
  - 17 June: The body of Italian banker Roberto Calvi is found hanging from Blackfriars Bridge.
  - 27 June: Brymon Airways' Captain Harry Gee lands a de Havilland Canada Dash 7 turboprop aircraft on Heron Quays in the nearby West India Docks to demonstrate the feasibility of the STOLport project, the basis of London City Airport. This then officially opens on 5 November 1987.
  - 20 July: The Hyde Park and Regent's Park bombings take place.
  - 12 October: The London Victory Parade of 1982 takes place.
  - October: The Thames Barrier begins operating; it is officially opened on 8 May 1984.
  - The Broadgate development in the City begins.
  - The Black Audio Film Collective is active.
  - 1982–1986: John Duffy and David Mulcahy commit multiple murders and rapes near railway stations in and around London.
- 1983
  - 14 January: Shooting of Stephen Waldorf: armed police shoot and severely injure an innocent car passenger in Earl's Court believing him to be an escaped prisoner.
  - 4 April: Gunmen escape with £7,000,000 from a Security Express van, making it the biggest cash haul in British history.
  - 16 May: Wheel clamps are first used to combat illegal parking in London.
  - July–August: London temperatures reach and exceed 30 °C (86 °F).
  - 22 September: The Docklands redevelopment begins with the opening of an Enterprise Zone on the Isle of Dogs.
  - 7 October: A plan to abolish the Greater London Council is announced.
  - 21 October: A thanksgiving ceremony takes place in St Martin-in-the-Fields in memory of the late David Niven.
  - 4 November: Dennis Nilsen is sentenced at the Old Bailey to life imprisonment for the murder of at least 12 young men in a series of killings committed since 1978 in north London.
  - 26 November: Brink's-Mat robbery: £26,000,000-worth of gold bullion and other valuables are stolen from a warehouse at the Heathrow International Trading Estate.
  - 17 December: Harrods bombings: a Provisional Irish Republican Army (IRA) car bomb kills 6 people (3 police and 3 members of the public) and injures 90 people outside Harrods. A second bomb on Christmas Day in Oxford Street explodes without injuries.
  - Mary Donaldson becomes the first female Lord Mayor of London, and Sam Beaver King becomes first black mayor of the London Borough of Southwark.
  - Thames Water shuts down the reciprocating stationary steam engines at its Waddon pumping station, the last in Britain to pump drinking water by steam.
  - Chelsea Physic Garden opens to the general public as a heritage attraction for the first time.
  - The Sankofa Film and Video Collective is founded.
- 1984
  - 4 April: The Churchill War Rooms open as a museum.
  - 17 April: Murder of Yvonne Fletcher: a police officer is shot from the Embassy of Libya in St. James's Square.
  - 29 June: London Transport passes from control of the Greater London Council to London Regional Transport (reporting to the Department of Transport).
  - 23 November: Serious fire in the Victoria line tunnel at Oxford Circus tube station.
  - Regent's College is established by Rockford College in Regent's Park; it moves to the premises vacated by Bedford College in 1985.
  - London Fashion Week begins.
- 1985
  - 6 January: The Capitalcard, predecessor of the Travelcard, is introduced, making it the first season ticket valid on both London Transport and British Rail services.
  - 16 January: The Dorchester Hotel is bought by the Sultan of Brunei.
  - 19 February: Soap opera EastEnders debuts on BBC television.
  - 11 March: Harrods is bought by Mohammed Al Fayed.
  - 13 July: Live Aid takes place at Wembley Stadium alongside a similar performance in Philadelphia.
  - 6 October: Death of Keith Blakelock: a police constable is brutally murdered in the Broadwater Farm riot on the Broadwater Farm estate of 1967–71 in Tottenham.
  - 25–26 December: Northolt siege, a domestic hostage-taking and murder in which for the first time an officer of the Metropolitan Police Firearms Wing opens fire.
  - Bedford College merges with Royal Holloway College and moves to the latter's Egham campus.
- 1986
  - 24 January–5 February 1987: Wapping dispute: employees of News International strike over the transfer of the company's newspaper production to Wapping with the adoption of new technology. Within a year of the strike's collapse, most national newspapers will follow News International's lead in moving from Fleet Street to the Docklands.
  - 31 March
    - The Greater London Council is abolished, and responsibility for the blue plaque scheme passes to English Heritage.
    - A fire damages Hampton Court Palace.
  - 12 April: Heathrow Terminal 4 opens.
  - 10 June: London & South Eastern (L&SE) suburban rail operations rebranded as Network SouthEast (NSE).
  - 27 June: The last train departs from Broad Street station.
  - 11–12 July: Queen perform at Wembley Stadium in front of audiences of 72,000 on each night.
  - 27 October: "Big Bang": deregulation of the London Stock Exchange leads to substantial changes in the City financial markets.
  - 29 October: The M25 motorway (London orbital) is completed, which creates a new de facto definition of the Greater London area.
  - 18 November: Lloyd's building, designed by Richard Rogers, opens.
- 1987
  - January: The Westminster cemeteries scandal begins.
  - 24 February–23 July: The London Daily News is published.
  - 10 May: The City church of St Mary-at-Hill is gutted by fire.
  - 30 July: The Docklands Light Railway begins operation.
  - 15–16 October: The Great Storm of 1987 hits London, and many trees are felled.
  - 26 October: London City Airport begins commercial operation.
  - 18 November: 31 people are killed in the King's Cross fire.
  - The Palace of Westminster and Westminster Abbey including St Margaret’s Church are inscribed on the UNESCO List of World Heritage Sites.
  - Richmond Riverside, London, designed by Quinlan Terry, completed.
  - The American Richard Serra's Cor-Ten steel sculpture Fulcrum is installed in Broadgate in the city.
- 1988
  - 16 May: Thameslink's north–south cross-London suburban rail services are introduced by Network SouthEast (NSE).
  - July: Surrey Quays Shopping Centre opens on the former site of the Surrey Commercial Docks in Rotherhithe. This leads to a de facto renaming of the surrounding residential area as Surrey Quays.
  - 1 August: Inglis Barracks bombing: A soldier is killed and Inglis Barracks is damaged in an IRA bombing.
  - 12 December: 35 people are killed in the Clapham Junction rail crash.
  - Approximate date: Al-Hayat newspaper headquartered in London.
- 1989
  - 4 March: Purley station rail crash: 5 people are killed in a collision following driver's error.
  - 29 June: A replacement sundial column is unveiled at Seven Dials.
  - 20 August: Marchioness disaster: 51 people are killed when the dredger Bowbelle collides with the chartered pleasure boat Marchioness on the Thames near Cannon Street Railway Bridge in the early hours of the morning.
  - October–December: Gates erected across Downing Street.
  - 25 December: The first mass of the Melkite Greek Catholic Church parish in London is celebrated.
  - London's Air Ambulance begins operation.
  - The Design Museum opens in Shad Thames.
  - The management of Hampstead Heath is taken over by Corporation of London.
  - The North East London Polytechnic is renamed as the Polytechnic of East London.
  - Remains of The Rose and Globe Theatre are discovered.
  - After spending most of the decade closed down, Whiteleys re-opens as a shopping centre.
  - Truman's Brewery closes.

== 1990 to 1999 ==
- 1990
  - 26 January: The last trains use Holborn Viaduct railway station, and the railway bridge over Ludgate Hill is demolished.
  - 4 March: The first legal terrestrial London specialist independent radio station, Jazz FM, is launched.
  - 31 March: The Poll Tax Riot takes place.
  - 1 April: The Inner London Education Authority is abolished.
  - 2 May: The City bonds robbery takes place.
  - 3 May: The 1990 London local elections take place; in Westminster, these give rise to the homes for votes scandal.
  - 6 May: The STD code 01 is divided between 071 (exchanges in the Central sector) and 081.
  - 10 July: The first Hampton Court Palace Flower Show is opened by Princess Anne.
  - 20 July: A Provisional Irish Republican Army bomb explodes at the Stock Exchange Tower.
  - 1 September: The former "Pirate" radio station Kiss FM relaunches as a licensed broadcaster.
  - Telehouse Europe begins operation of Europe's first purpose-built carrier-neutral colocation centre, in the Docklands, and it becomes the UK's main Internet hub.
- 1991
  - 8 January: A train crash at Cannon Street station kills one person and injures over 500.
  - 7 February: The Downing Street mortar attack is carried out by the Provisional Irish Republican Army.
  - 18 February: A man is killed in the Victoria station and Paddington station bombings.
  - 2 April: HM Prison Belmarsh becomes operational on part of the Woolwich Arsenal site.
  - 21 May: Festival Pier collapses.
  - 10 June: The National Gallery in Trafalgar Square opens its new Sainsbury Wing to the public.
  - 8 July: Provisional Irish Republican Army members Nessan Quinlivan and Pearse McAuley, detained on charges of conspiracy to murder, shoot their way out of Brixton Prison.
  - 15 July: 17th G7 summit held in London.
  - 26 August: One Canada Square, the "Canary Wharf tower", opens.
  - 24 November: Queen frontman Freddie Mercury dies of AIDS-related bronchial pneumonia at his home, Garden Lodge, Kensington, after announcing his diagnosis the day before. A tribute concert for him takes place at Wembley Stadium on 20 April 1992.
  - 12–15 December: Concentration of vehicle exhausts in London causes an estimated 160 deaths.
  - Embankment Place office and commercial complex above Charing Cross railway station, designed by Terry Farrell and Partners, opens.
- 1992
  - 28 February: London Bridge station bombing by the IRA.
  - 10 April: Baltic Exchange bombing by the IRA kills 3.
  - September: First Open House London event takes place.
  - October: The University of Greenwich is formed from Thames Polytechnic.
  - 9 October: 2 suspected IRA bombs explode in London, but there are no injuries.
  - November: The University of East London is formed from the Polytechnic of East London.
  - 1 December: The University of Westminster is formed from the Polytechnic of Central London, itself a successor to the 1838 Polytechnic.
  - 10 December: 2 people are injured by IRA bombs in Wood Green. Then on 16 December, 4 people are injured by IRA bombs on Oxford Street.
  - London Guildhall University is formed from the City of London Polytechnic; the University of North London is formed from the Polytechnic of North London; Middlesex University is formed from Middlesex Polytechnic; and Kingston University is formed from Kingston Polytechnic.
  - The Ark office block in Hammersmith, designed by Ralph Erskine, completed.
  - Bramah Tea and Coffee Museum originally opens at Butler's Wharf.
- 1993
  - 1 January: Carlton Television takes over from Thames as the weekday independent television franchise holder for the London area.
  - 28 January: Harrods bombings: a bomb planted by English IRA sympathisers injures 4 people outside Harrods.
  - 22 April: The murder of Stephen Lawrence takes place in Eltham.
  - 24 April: 1993 Bishopsgate bombing: an IRA truck bomb explodes in the City, killing 1 person and causing £350,000,000 worth of damage.
  - 17 May: The Limehouse Link tunnel opens.
  - 4 August: Millwall F.C.'s New Den stadium opens in Bermondsey.
  - Traffic and Environmental Zone around the City of London is established.
  - The Thames Water Ring Main is completed.
- 1994
  - 26 February: Clerkenwell cinema fire: 11 people die as the result of arson at the Dream City adult cinema.
  - 1 April: Suburban rail Network SouthEast (NSE) is disbanded with its operations transferred to train operating units ready for privatisation. On 5 April, the isolated Waterloo & City line passes from its control to the London Underground.
  - 14 July: The SIS Building, headquarters of the Secret Intelligence Service designed by Terry Farrell, opens on the Albert Embankment in Vauxhall.
  - 30 September: The London Underground ceases the shuttle services on the Aldwych branch and from Epping to Ongar in Essex.
  - 21 October: The Heathrow tunnel collapse: a rail tunnel under construction for the Heathrow Express fails.
  - 30 October: London Docklands Development Corporation (LDDC) powers in Bermondsey revert to the London Borough of Southwark, making it the LDDC's first dedesignation.
  - 14 November: The Eurostar train service to Paris Gare du Nord via the Channel Tunnel begins operating from Waterloo International railway station.
  - November: The South East London Combined Heat and Power plant is opened in South Bermondsey.
  - The City of London's Golden Lane Estate is brought wholly within its administrative boundary, with a boundary line down Goswell Road.
  - Finsbury Park Mosque opens.
- 1995
  - 16 April: As part of phONEday in the United Kingdom, London's STD codes 071 and 081 become 0171 and 0181 respectively.
  - 20 August: The BAPS Shri Swaminarayan Mandir London, Europe's first traditional-style purpose-built Hindu temple (and England's largest), is inaugurated in Neasden.
  - 8 December: Head teacher Philip Lawrence dies after being stabbed while protecting a pupil from a teenage gang outside his school in Maida Vale.
  - 13 December: 1995 Brixton riot.
  - 31 December: London Docklands Development Corporation (LDDC) powers in Beckton revert to the London Borough of Newham.
  - Barts and The London School of Medicine and Dentistry merge together with Queen Mary and Westfield College.
  - Blackwell's of Oxford open a bookshop on Charing Cross Road.
- 1996
  - 9 February: 1996 Docklands bombing: A Provisional Irish Republican Army (IRA) truck bomb explodes at Canary Wharf, killing 2 people. On 18 February an IRA bomb explodes on a bus in central London, killing the transporter, Edward O'Brien, and injuring 8 other people, including the driver. On 15 July an IRA unit plotting to disrupt the London electricity supply is arrested in Operation AIRLINES.
  - 13 November: The Stone of Scone is taken away from Westminster Abbey after 600 years, and returned to Scotland.
  - 20 December: London Docklands Development Corporation (LDDC) powers in Surrey Docks revert to the London Borough of Southwark.
- 1997
  - 31 January: London Docklands Development Corporation powers in Limehouse and Wapping revert to the London Borough of Tower Hamlets.
  - March: The London Aquarium opens in the former County Hall on the South Bank.
  - 27 May: Shakespeare's Globe, a reconstruction of the Elizabethan Globe Theatre on the South Bank, opens with its first public performance.
  - 6 September: The Funeral of Diana, Princess of Wales takes place in Westminster Abbey.
  - 19 September: The Southall rail crash: 7 people are killed in collision on the Great Western Main Line (GWML).
  - 7 October: The Royal Victoria Dock Bridge, designed by Lifschutz Davidson, officially opens as a footbridge in the Docklands; the option to add a transporter bridge gondola is never adopted.
  - 24 October: Death of Nina Mackay, a 25-year-old WPC who is stabbed in Stratford when entering a flat to arrest a man with paranoid schizophrenia.
  - 10 October: London Docklands Development Corporation (LDDC) powers in the Isle of Dogs and Poplar revert to the London Borough of Tower Hamlets.
  - 24 November: The new British Library building in St Pancras opens to readers.
  - 18 December: London River Services is incorporated as a subsidiary of London Regional Transport to take over the responsibilities of the Thames Pier Agency.
  - The Greater London Record Office is renamed as the London Metropolitan Archives.
- 1998
  - 3 March: Construction of the Millennium Dome begins.
  - 31 March: The London Docklands Development Corporation is wound up, and its remaining powers in the Royal Docks revert to the London Borough of Newham.
  - 7 May: The 1998 Greater London Authority referendum gives support for creation of a Greater London Authority.
  - 19 June: Heathrow Express, a dedicated rail service between Paddington station and the airport, begins full operation.
- 1999
  - February: The 'Macpherson report', produced in response to the 1993 murder of Stephen Lawrence, finds that the Metropolitan Police is "institutionally racist".
  - 16 March: The Metro launches as a weekday tabloid free newspaper in London.
  - 14 April: Edgar Pearce, the "Mardi Gra bomber", is convicted for a series of bombings targeted at banks and supermarkets around London and sentenced to 21 years in jail.
  - 17–30 April: 1999 London nail bombings: David Copeland plants nail bombs targeting black, Bengali and gay communities, killing 3 and injuring more than 100.
  - May: London IMAX cinema opens on the South Bank.
  - 21 May: The film Notting Hill is released.
  - 24 May: The Thames Clippers ferry service starts operating along the Thames to connect Central London with some of its inner suburbs.
  - July
    - The Fourth plinth, Trafalgar Square is first occupied by Mark Wallinger's Ecce Homo.
    - The Green Bridge carries Mile End Park over the Mile End Road.
  - 5 October: The Ladbroke Grove rail crash: 31 people are killed in a collision on the Great Western Main Line (GWML).
  - 31 December: The Millennium Dome on Greenwich Peninsula, the London Eye on the South Bank, and the Jubilee Line Extension serving Canary Wharf tube station are officially opened.
  - The University of Greenwich occupies portions of the Old Royal Naval College.
  - Antony Gormley's sculpture Quantum Cloud is erected on the Greenwich Peninsula.
  - The Cathedral of the Dormition of the Most Holy Mother of God, within the Russian Orthodox Diocese of Great Britain and Ireland, opens in Chiswick.

== See also ==
- Timeline of London
- History of London

== Bibliography ==
See also lists of works about London by period: Tudor London, Stuart London, 18th century, 19th century, 1900–1939, 1960s

published in the 19th century

- Elmes, James (1831). Topographical Dictionary of London and Its Environs. London: Whittaker, Treacher and Arnot.
- Thomas Allen; Thomas Wright (1839). "Account of the Companies of the City of London, Alphabetically Arranged". History and Antiquities of London, Westminster, Southwark, and Parts Adjacent. Vol. 2. London. pp. 376–429. hdl:2027/hvd.hwh1uq.
- "London". Penny Cyclopaedia. Vol. 14. London: Charles Knight. 1839. pp. 109–129. hdl:2027/ucm.5319406728.
- Charles Knight, ed. (1844), "Metropolitan Boroughs", London, vol. 6, London: C. Knight & Co.
- Peter Cunningham (1850), "Chronology of London Occurrences", Handbook of London (2nd ed.), London: John Murray, OCLC 4773921
- J. Willoughby Rosse (1859). "London". Index of Dates ... Facts in the Chronology and History of the World. Bohn's reference library. London: H.G. Bohn. hdl:2027/hvd.32044098621048 – via HathiTrust.
- Timbs, John (1866), Club Life of London, London: J. Bentley, OL 7098926M
- George Henry Townsend (1867), "London", A Manual of Dates (2nd ed.), London: Frederick Warne & Co., pp. 587–590
- William Henry Overall, ed. (1870), "London", Dictionary of Chronology, London: William Tegg, OCLC 2613202
- Charles Dickens (1882), "Historical Events", Dickens's Dictionary of London, London: Macmillan & Co.
- John and Robert Maxwell (1885). "Memorable Dates". Concise Guide to London. London. circa 1882
- R. Price-Williams (1885), "Population of London, 1801–81", Journal of the Statistical Society, vol. 48, pp. 349–432, hdl:2027/uc1.b4148209
- Mrs. Basil Holmes (1896). "Burial-Grounds within the Metropolitan Area". London Burial Grounds. Macmillan.

published in the 20th century

- Henry Barton Baker (1904), "Chronological List of the London Theatres", History of the London Stage and its Famous Players (1576–1903), London: Routledge
- Robert Donald, ed. (1907). "London". Municipal Year Book of the United Kingdom for 1907. London: Edward Lloyd. pp. 5–47.
- Howarth, Osbert John Radcliffe; Ingram, Thomas Allan; Wheatley, Henry Benjamin (1910). "London" . In Chisholm, Hugh (ed.). Encyclopædia Britannica. Vol. 16 (11th ed.). Cambridge University Press. pp. 938–968, see pages 945 and 951. "IV. Population, Public Health, &c. & VII. Government"
- Francis Miltoun (1908). "Brief Chronology". Dickens' London. Boston: L.C. Page & Company.
- Benjamin Vincent (1910), "London", Haydn's Dictionary of Dates (25th ed.), London: Ward, Lock & Co., pp. 839–848
- Walter H. Godfrey (1911), "List of Buildings on ... Map 1: The City of London and Southwark", History of Architecture in London, London: B.T. Batsford
- Cook's Handbook to London. London: Thos. Cook & Son. 1921.
- Muirhead, James Fullarton (1922). "London" . Encyclopædia Britannica. Vol. 31 (12th ed.).
- George F.E. Rudé (1971). Hanoverian London, 1714–1808. History of London. University of California Press. ISBN 978-0-520-01778-8.
- Nicholson, Louise (1998). "London Chronology". London. Abbeville Press. ISBN 978-0-7112-1187-2.

published in the 21st century

- John Richardson (2000). The Annals of London: A Year-by-year Record of a Thousand Years of History. University of California Press. ISBN 978-0-520-22795-8.
- Leonard Schwarz (2000). "London, 1700–1840". In Peter Clark (ed.). Cambridge Urban History of Britain. Vol. 2. Cambridge University Press. p. 641+. ISBN 978-0-521-43141-5.
- Ackroyd, Peter (2001), "Chronology", London: the Biography, Nan A. Talese, ISBN 9780385497701
- Erika Diane Rappaport (2001). Shopping for Pleasure: Women in the Making of London's West End. Princeton University Press. ISBN 0-691-04476-7.
- A.N. Wilson (2004). "Chronology of London History". London: A History. Modern Library. p. 193+. ISBN 978-0-307-42665-9.
- Ben Weinreb; et al. (2008). The London Encyclopaedia (3rd ed.). Macmillan. ISBN 978-0-230-73878-2.
- Michelin; Lifestyle, Michelin Travel (2012). "20C to Today (timeline)". London. Michelin Green Guide. ISBN 978-2-06-718238-7.
- Jonathan Conlin (2013). Tales of Two Cities: Paris, London and the Birth of the Modern City. Counterpoint LLC. ISBN 978-1-61902-225-6.
- Marc Matera (2015). Black London: The Imperial Metropolis and Decolonization in the Twentieth Century. University of California Press. ISBN 978-0-520-95990-3.
