= Pimlico District Heating Undertaking =

Coordinates: 51.485896°N 0.14028758°W

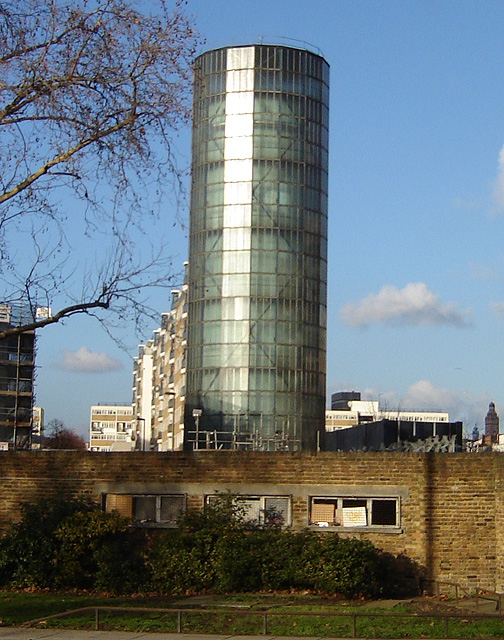
The system's thermal store in Churchill Gardens.

The Pimlico District Heating Undertaking (PDHU) is a district heating system in Pimlico, City of Westminster, United Kingdom. The first district heating system built in the United Kingdom, it is owned by Westminster City Council and operated by CityWest Homes. The system is connected to 3,256 homes, 50 business premises and three schools.

== History ==
The system began operations in 1950, and originally used waste heat from Battersea Power Station, which was pumped under the River Thames through a disused Metropolitan Water Board tunnel. A thermal store was built in Churchill Gardens, which could hold 2,300m³ and remains the largest thermal store in the UK. The system was originally built to serve 1,600 council homes. By 1958 Battersea was operating with a thermal efficiency of 25%, making it one of the world's most efficient power stations at the time.

After Battersea Power Station closed in 1983, a 30MW coal-fired boiler was built to supply the system with heat. The boiler was subsequently converted to gas in 1989. A refurbishment in 2006 saw two 1.55MWe CHP engines and three 8MW gas boilers installed. The system generates around 51GWh of heat and 16GWh of electricity per year.

Based on the operational success of the Pimlico undertaking several schemes were proposed, and one was partly built, using waste heat from Bankside power station. However, none were economically viable.

== Updating the system ==
As of 2024 the pipework in the system is beyond its design life. Repairs to the leaking system are disruptive to residents and are expensive. Insulation is also substandard. Westminster City Council is considering various options, either to update the centralised system, or decommissioning it and providing heating and hot water independently to individual properties by direct electric heating
