= Philip Powell (architect) =

English architect

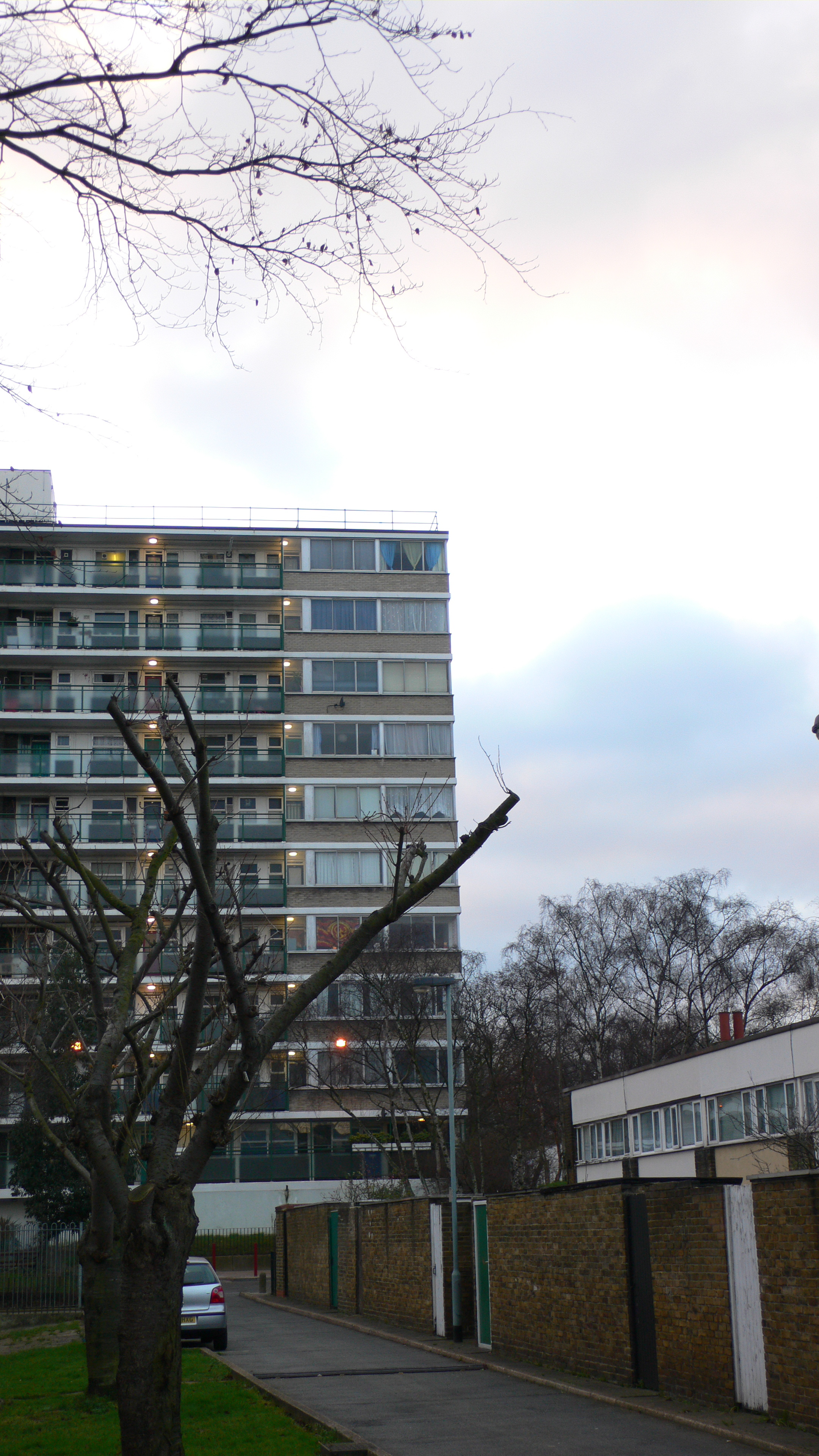
Houses and flats by Powell and Moya, Gospel Oak, London

Sir Arnold Joseph Philip Powell CH OBE RA FRIBA (15 March 1921 – 5 May 2003), usually known as Philip Powell, was an English post-war architect.

He was educated at Epsom College and then the Architectural Association.

He was the father of "Humane modernism", and is famous for designing the main stage at the Chichester Festival Theatre. He also designed the Skylon and the Churchill Gardens housing estate in Pimlico.

He founded a practice with Hidalgo Moya, Powell & Moya Architect Practice. Peter Skinner joined the practice in 1948 and later became a partner. They won a competition to build Churchill Gardens, Pimlico, a complex that houses 5,000 people in 1,800 flats. They were aged 24 and 23 respectively. They were then invited by Frederick Gibberd to design a housing project in Harlow New Town. Northbrooks sits imposingly above a valley to the south of the town centre, affording good views from and to the four-storey slab blocks. However, arguments with Harlow Design Corporation over the use of flat roofs led to the pair terminating their involvement prior to completion. They undertook no more work in the town, much to the disappointment of Gibberd, who had lectured them at the Architects' Association School.

They designed the Skylon Installation at the 1951 Festival of Britain, which sought to instil a sense of positive feeling at a time of postwar depression.

Powell designed Mayfield School for Girls, West Hill, Putney, London, S.W.15.; a number of Oxford and Cambridge University buildings including Wolfson College, Oxford, Blue Boar Quad at Christ Church, and Cripps Court at Queens' College, Cambridge, the courtyard at the Museum of London and Chichester Festival Theatre.

In 1974, Powell and Moya became the first to win the RIBA Gold Medal for architecture as a Practice.

Powell was knighted in 1975 after years of dedicated work as a member of the Royal Fine Arts Commission. He died in London.

National Life Stories conducted an oral history interview (C467/11) with Philip Powell in 1997 for its Architects Lives' collection held by the British Library.
