= CityWest Homes =

Housing management company in London

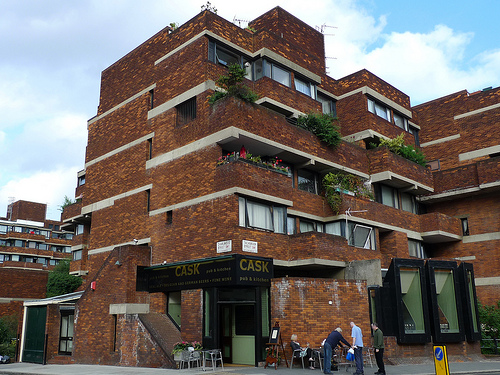
Lillington and Longmoore Gardens, one of CityWest Homes' estates.

CityWest Homes was an arm's length management organisation (ALMO) of Westminster City Council, Greater London, England, established in April 2002 in order to manage its housing stock. They managed over 21,000 properties which included council tenant and leaseholder homes in the London borough of Westminster and elsewhere. In the City of Westminster, there are the following estates:

- Bayswater
- Church Street
- Churchill Gardens
- Grosvenor
- Lillington and Longmoore
- Lisson Green
- Maida Vale
- Marylebone
- Mozart
- Paddington Green
- Pimlico
- Queens Park
- St John's Wood
- Soho and Covent Garden

CityWest Homes set up its lettings arm (CityWest Homes Residential) in 2009 and lets many properties in Westminster within the private sector to professional tenants, companies and students.

In 2011, Westminster City Council renewed the contract for CityWest Homes. The contract was expected to run until 2022. The former Westminster Council’s head of housing, the controversial councillor Jonathan Glanz said the organisation’s performance was the main reason for supporting the renewal of the contract.

However, since renewal of the contract, CityWest Homes has not been without controversy, particularly over its management of the Hallfield Estate refurbishment. CityWest Homes also came in for criticism from its tenants regarding poor maintenance and failure to tackle antisocial behaviour. This was highlighted in a 2017 independent review of CityWest Homes by Campbell Tickell for Westminster City Council "that residents are being failed by CityWest Homes".

CityWest Homes' management of services and estates was progressively rolled back and returned to Westminster City Council management, this unwinding of the ALMO was given impetus when poor housing management of various council ALMO’s came into the media spotlight following the 2017 Grenfell tower block fire. In September 2018 The decision was taken to terminate CityWest Homes. On 31 March 2019 CityWest Homes ceased to exist and all remaining housing management functions were transferred back to Westminster City Council.
