= Hidalgo Moya =

American architect

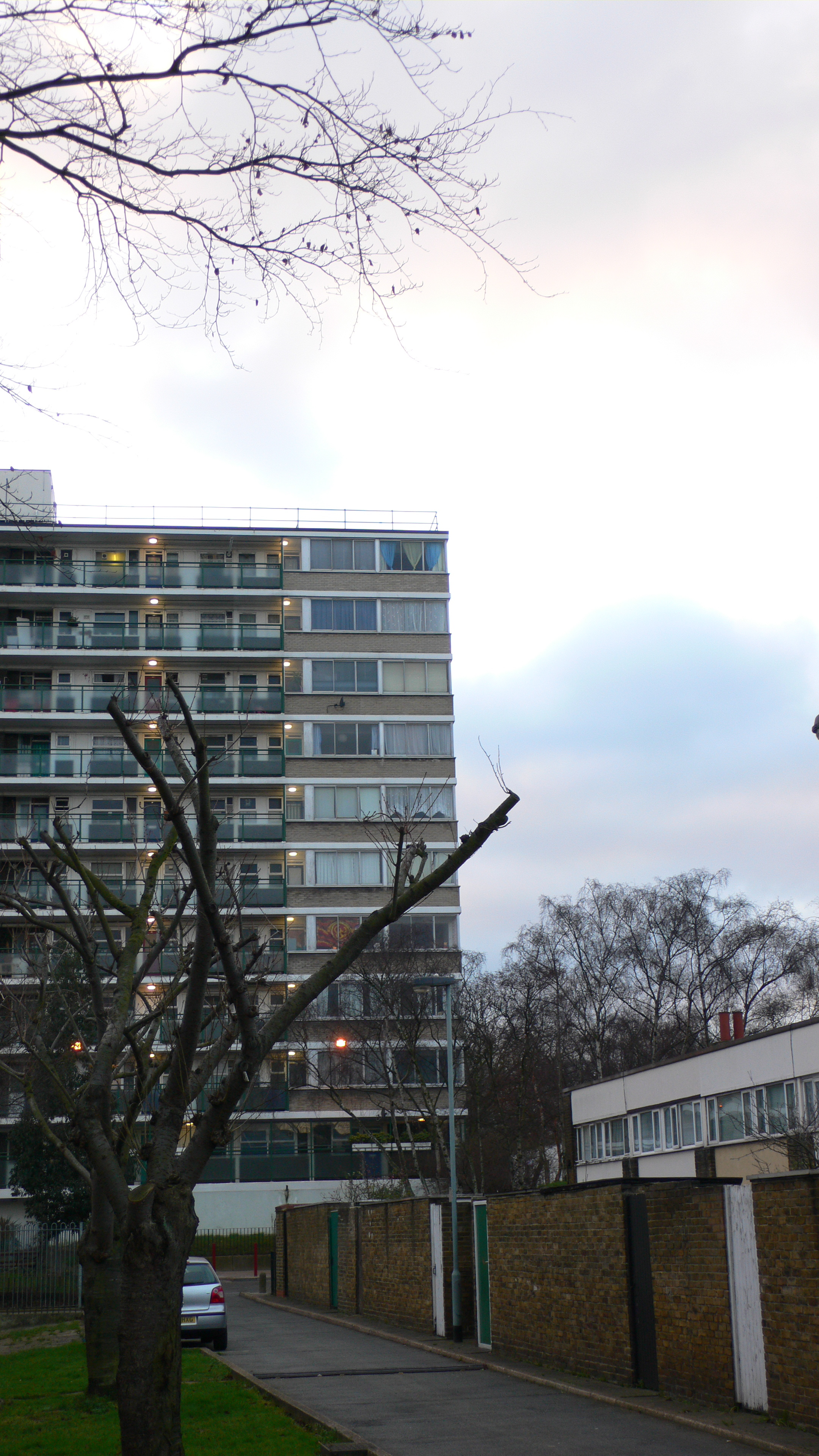
Houses and flats by Powell and Moya, Gospel Oak, London

John Hidalgo Moya (5 May 1920 – 3 August 1994), sometimes known as Jacko Moya, was an American-born architect who lived and worked largely in England.

== Biography ==
Born 5 May 1920 in Los Gatos, California, US, to an English mother and Mexican father, Moya lived in England from infancy. He formed the architectural practice Powell & Moya Architect Practice with Philip Powell.

Among other projects, Powell and Moya designed Chichester Festival Theatre, the Skylon (the landmark structure of the 1951 Festival of Britain), Churchill Gardens in Pimlico, Northbrooks in Harlow, St Paul's School, London, the Museum of London, Christ Church Picture Gallery, Oxford and Wolfson College, Oxford.

Moya retired in 1992 to live in Rye, Sussex, England. He died in Hastings on 3 August 1994 age 74.
