= Churchill Gardens =

Housing estate in Pimlico, London

Churchill Gardens Estate
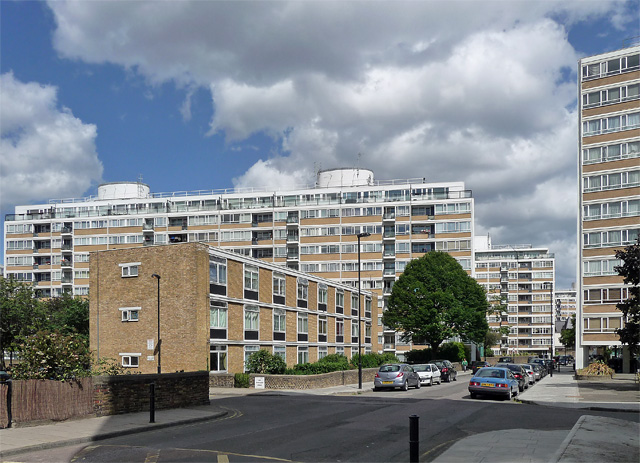
- Interactive map of the Churchill Gardens Estate area

General information
- Location: Pimlico, Westminster, London
- Coordinates: 51.487°N 0.1407°W
- Construction started: 1946
- Completed: 1962
- Client: Westminster City Council
- Landlord: Westminster City Council

Design and construction
- Architects: Philip Powell; Hidalgo Moya
- Awards and prizes: RIBA London Architectural Bronze Medal (1950)

Churchill Gardens is a large housing estate in the Pimlico area of Westminster, London. The estate was developed between 1946 and 1962 to a design by the architects Powell and Moya, replacing Victorian terraced houses extensively damaged during the Blitz.

Comprising 1,600 homes in 32 blocks, the estate is notable as the only housing project completed under the ambitious Abercrombie Plan to redevelop the capital on more "efficient" lines. Tall slabs of between nine and eleven storeys are enclosed by seven storey blocks and interspersed with maisonettes and terraces. A pioneering example of mixed development, it acted as a model for many subsequent public housing projects, although few matched its size and even fewer achieved its architectural distinction or social diversity.

Many of the estate's tall buildings are accessible using lifts leading directly onto the street, with a local lift serving all floors and an express lift serving only floors that are multiples of 3.

The estate is also notable for its early and rare example of district heating in the UK, the Pimlico District Heating Undertaking. A glass-faced accumulator tower was built to collect the CHP by-product heat in hot water from the now-disused Battersea Power Station on the opposite side of the Thames, providing heat and hot water throughout the estate. The system was upgraded in 2006 to allow it to supply an additional 1,400 homes.

Churchill Gardens was designated a conservation area in 1990, and in 1998 six blocks (Chaucer House, Coleridge House, Shelley House, Keats House, Gilbert House and Sullivan House) as well as the accumulator tower were Grade II listed.

Between 2002 and 2019, the estate was managed by CityWest Homes, an arm's length management organisation (ALMO) of Westminster City Council. After the fire at Grenfell Tower in North Kensington killed 72 people, management was brought directly under Westminster City Council.

Churchill Gardens formed the bulk of Churchill ward within the area under local administrative control by Westminster Council until the 2022 election, when the estate became part of Pimlico South ward.

The landscape of the Churchill Gardens estate is Grade II listed on the Register of Historic Parks and Gardens. Several buildings within the estate listed Grade II on the National Heritage List for England. Coleridge House, Chaucer House, Shelley House, Keats House, Gilbert House and Sullivan House are all individually listed Grade II. A pair of shelters outside the Chaucer House are listed Grade II. The accumulator tower and district heating workshop is also Grade II listed.
