= Street names of Pimlico and Victoria =

This is a list of the etymology of street names in the London districts of Pimlico and Victoria. The area has no formally defined boundaries – those utilised here are the generally accepted ones of: Vauxhall Bridge Road to the north-east, the river Thames to the south, the Victoria railway line, Buckingham Palace Road/Buckingham Gate/Grosvenor Gardens to the west and Lower Grosvenor Place/Bressenden Place to the north. Victoria is a vaguely defined area, but is generally used to refer to streets immediately around the station of that name.

- Alderney Street – this street was changed to ‘Alderley Street’ in 1879, in honour of the Stanley of Alderley family; however they were not pleased with this move and so the name was changed; prior to this it was Stanley Street, after George Stanley, local landowner
- Allington Street – after Allington, Lincolnshire
- Aylesford Street – this land was formerly part of the Grosvenor family Estate; as the last of their lands to be developed they had seemingly run out of eponymous names from themselves, so they chose various pleasant-sounding aristocratic titles, of which this is one
- Balniel Gate
- Balvaird Place
- Beeston Place – this land was formerly part of the Grosvenor family estate; the family owned land in Beeston, Cheshire
- Belgrave Road
- Bessborough Gardens, Bessborough Place and Bessborough Street – after John Ponsonby, 5th Earl of Bessborough and later Baron Duncannon of Bessborough
- Bressenden Place – this street was built in 1962, replacing a small line of shops called Bressenden Row; the origin of the name is unknown
- Bridge Place – after the Eccleston Bridge that stood here
- Buckingham Palace Road – by association with Buckingham Palace, originally built for John Sheffield, Duke of Buckingham
- Bulleid Way - close to Victoria Station, this street was named after O V S Bulleid, Chief Mechanical Engineer of the Southern Railway from 1937 to 1948.
- Buonaparte Mews
- Cambridge Street – this land was formerly part of the Grosvenor family estate; as the last of their lands to be developed they had seemingly run out of eponymous names from themselves, so they chose various pleasant-sounding aristocratic titles, of which this is one
- Charlotte Place
- Charlwood Place and Charlwood Street – after Henry Wise, local 18th century landowner and gardener to William III, who owned land in Charlwood, Surrey
- Chichester Street – this land was formerly part of the Grosvenor family estate; as the last of their lands to be developed they had seemingly run out of eponymous names from themselves, so they chose various pleasant-sounding aristocratic titles, of which this is one
- Churchill Gardens Road – this post-war estate was named in honour of Prime Minister Winston Churchill
- Churton Place and Churton Street – this land was formerly part of the Grosvenor family Estate; they owned land in Churton, Cheshire
- Clarendon Street – this land was formerly part of the Grosvenor family Estate; as the last of their lands to be developed they had seemingly run out of eponymous names from themselves, so they chose various pleasant-sounding aristocratic titles, of which this is one
- Claverton Street – this land was formerly part of the Grosvenor family estate; they owned land in Claverton, Cheshire
- Colonnade Walk – presumably simply descriptive
- Cumberland Street – this land was formerly part of the Grosvenor family estate; as the last of their lands to be developed they had seemingly run out of eponymous names from themselves, so they chose various pleasant-sounding aristocratic titles, of which this is one
- Dell's Mews
- Denbigh Place and Denbigh Street – this land was formerly part of the Grosvenor family estate; as the last of their lands to be developed they had seemingly run out of eponymous names from themselves, so they chose various pleasant-sounding aristocratic titles, of which this is one
- Dolphin Square – after the 'dolphin' formerly located here; it was a pump for drawing out river water
- Drummond Gate
- Eaton Lane – this land was formerly part of the Grosvenor family estate; the family owned land in Eaton, Cheshire
- Ebury Bridge – as this area was formerly part of the manor of Ebury, thought to have originated as a Latinisation of the Anglo-Saxon toponym ‘eyai’, which means ‘island’ in reference to a marsh that once dominated the area; the bridge here formerly stood over a small stream
- Eccleston Square and Eccleston Square Mews – this land was formerly part of the Grosvenor family estate; they owned land in Eccleston, Cheshire
- Elizabeth Bridge – after Lady Elizabeth Leveson-Gower, wife of Richard Grosvenor, 2nd Marquess of Westminster
- Garden Terrace
- Gillingham Mews, Gillingham Row and Gillingham Street – this land was formerly part of the Grosvenor family estate; as the last of their lands to be developed they had seemingly run out of eponymous names from themselves, so they chose various pleasant-sounding aristocratic titles, of which this is one
- Glasgow Terrace
- Gloucester Street – this land was formerly part of the Grosvenor family estate; as the last of their lands to be developed they had seemingly run out of eponymous names from themselves, so they chose various pleasant-sounding aristocratic titles, of which this is one
- Grosvenor Gardens, Grosvenor Gardens Mews, Grosvenor Road and Lower Grosvenor Place – as this land was formerly part of the Grosvenor family estate
- Guildhouse Street – after the Guild House, which formerly stood near here on Eccleston Square from 1922 to 1946
- Hudson's Place – after the Hudson's furniture depository formerly located here, founded by William Hudson
- Hugh Mews and Hugh Street – after Hugh Grosvenor, 1st Duke of Westminster, whose family owned much of the surrounding land (though Hugh was a common name in the family and another individual may have been intended)
- Johnson's Place – after John Johnson, Victorian-era local paviour/owner
- Lindsay Square
- Longmoore Street – after the marshes formerly located here
- Lupus Street – after Hugh Grosvenor, 1st Duke of Westminster, whose family owned much of the surrounding land
- Moreton Place, Moreton Street and Moreton Terrace – after Henry Wise, local 18th century landowner and gardener to William III, who owned land near Moreton Morrell, Warwickshire
- Neathouse Place – after either an early settlement here of small cottages dubbed ‘neat houses’, or the Neate, a medieval manor located in Pimlico, stemming from a word meaning 'islet'
- Paxton Terrace – thought to be after Joseph Paxton, Victoria-era gardener and designer of The Crystal Palace
- Peabody Avenue – after George Peabody, 19th century American philanthropist in London
- Rampayne Street – after Charles Rampanyne, who in 1705 left funds in his will for the children of the nearby Grey Coat Hospital
- Ranelagh Road – as it led to the former New Ranelagh Tea Gardens on the Thames, named in imitation of the popular Ranelagh Gardens in Chelsea, which were named for Richard Jones, 1st Earl of Ranelagh
- St George's Drive, St George's Square and St George's Square Mews – after the manor of St George's, Hanover Square which originally stretched to the Thames, and was named for George I
- Simon Milton Square – after Simon Milton, late 20th century/early 21st century Conservative politician
- Sussex Street – this land was formerly part of the Grosvenor family estate; as the last of their lands to be developed they had seemingly run out of eponymous names from themselves, so they chose various pleasant-sounding aristocratic titles, of which this is one
- Sutherland Row and Sutherland Street – this land was formerly part of the Grosvenor family estate, several members of whom married into the Duke of Sutherland family
- Tachbrook Street and Upper Tachbrook Street – after Henry Wise, local 18th century landowner and gardener to William III, who owned land near Bishop's Tachbrook, Warwickshire
- Telford Terrace – after the pioneering engineer Thomas Telford
- Terminus Place – descriptive, as it lies outside Victoria station terminus
- Thorndike Street
- Turpentine Lane – as this lane was home to turpentine manufacturers in the 19th century
- Vauxhall Bridge Road – as it approaches Vauxhall Bridge, opened 1816
- Victoria Square and Victoria Street – after Queen Victoria, reigning monarch when the square was built in 1839 and the street in 1844-51
- Warwick Place North, Warwick Row, Warwick Square, Warwick Square Mews, Warwick Way, West Warwick Place – after Henry Wise, local 18th century landowner and gardener to William III, who owned land in Warwickshire
- West Mews – a shortening of its pre-1936 name Warwick Place Mews West
- Westmoreland Place and Westmoreland Terrace – this land was formerly part of the Grosvenor family estate; as the last of their lands to be developed they had seemingly run out of eponymous names from themselves, so they chose various pleasant-sounding aristocratic titles, of which this is one
- Wilton Road – this land was formerly part of the Grosvenor family Estate; Robert Grosvenor, 1st Marquess of Westminster married Eleanor Egerton, daughter of Thomas Egerton, 1st Earl of Wilton
- Winchester Street – this land was formerly part of the Grosvenor family estate; as the last of their lands to be developed they had seemingly run out of eponymous names from themselves, so they chose various pleasant-sounding aristocratic titles, of which this is one
