= Lord High Admiral, Pimlico =

Former pub in Pimlico, London

Coordinates: 51.491098°N 0.135264°W

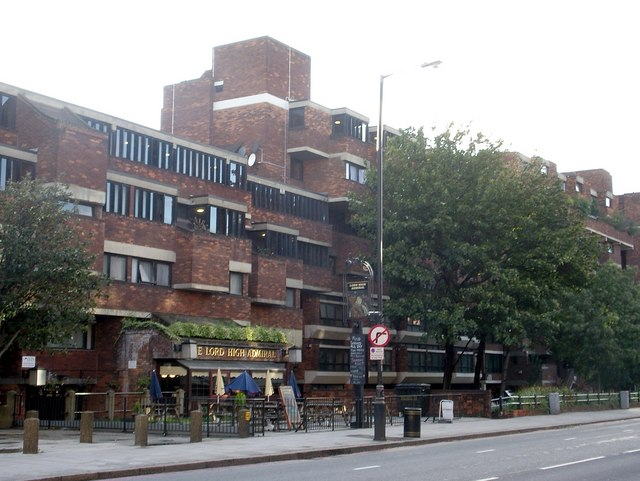
The Lord High Admiral

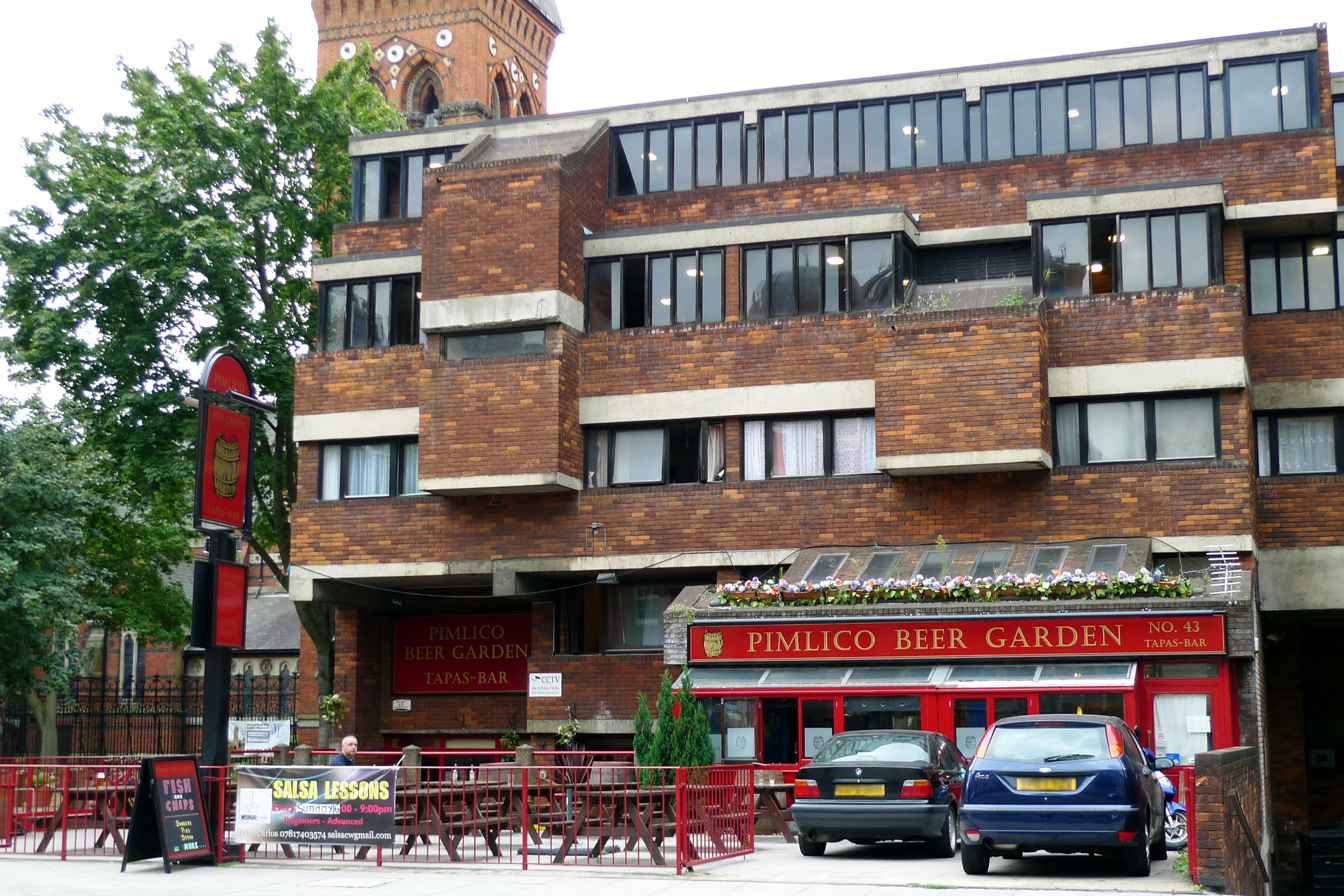
Later Pimlico Beer Garden

The Lord High Admiral is a Grade II* listed former public house at 43 Vauxhall Bridge Road, Pimlico, London.

English Heritage note that it is attached to Charlwood House (also Grade II* listed). The design is as the result of a competition won in 1961 by John Darbourne. The structure was built in 1964–67, and the interior fitted out 1968–69. The architects were John Darbourne and Geoffrey Darke, Darbourne & Darke. It was later renamed as the Pimlico Beer Garden, then became the Moo Cantina Argentina restaurant for ten years, closing in 2022.
