= St George's Square =

Garden square in Pimlico, London, England

Coordinates: 51.488°N 0.135°W

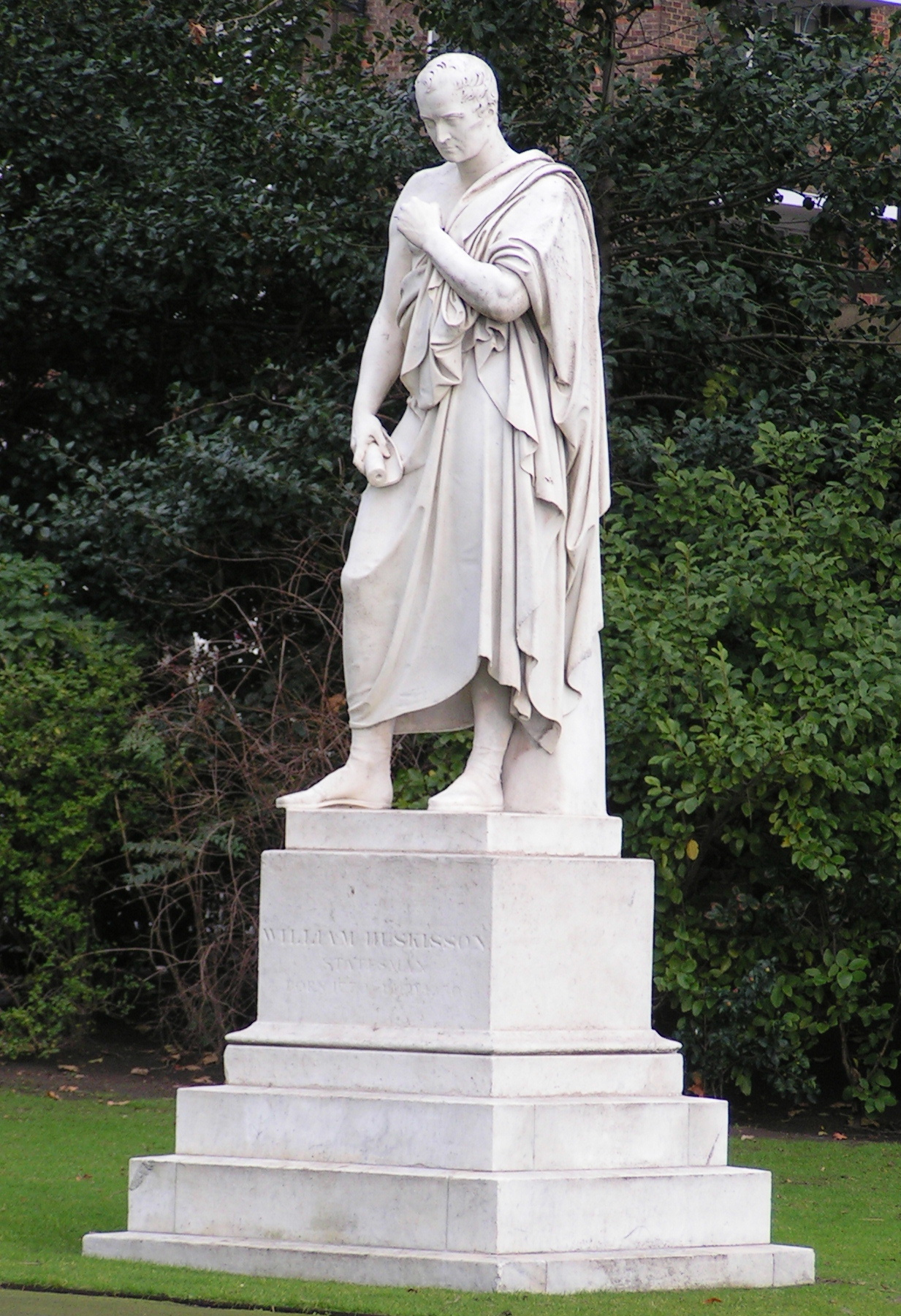
The Huskisson statue in Pimlico Gardens by John Gibson (sculptor)

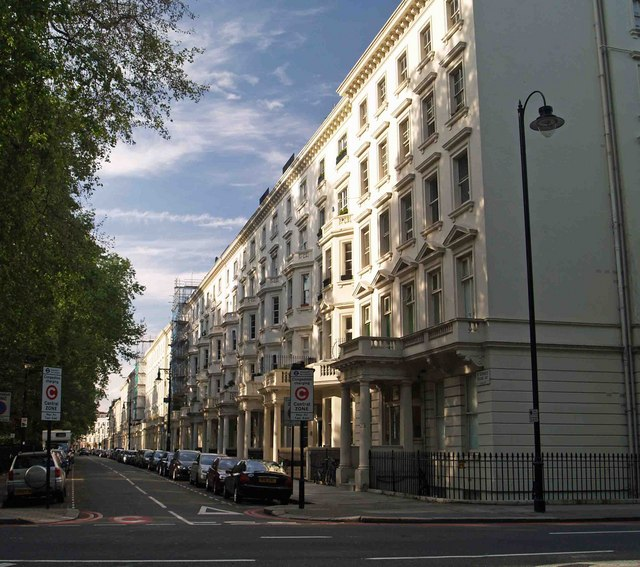
Houses lining one side and some of the tall trees opposite

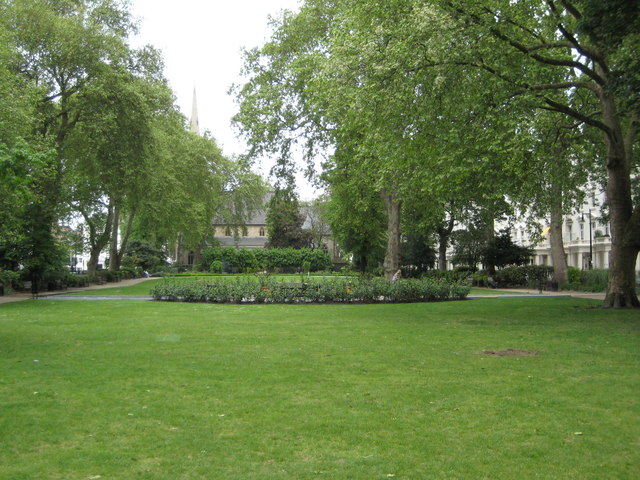
View along the public gardens and the church in the same square, in the background

St George's Square is a very long garden square in affluent Pimlico, Central London. It benefits from gardens and a church in its central area. Near the northern acute angle, the square is intersected by Lupus Street. Pimlico tube station is a short distance east. Its north-east side is in effect Belgrave Road and southern side is arterial Grosvenor Road which is lined by a small public garden in front of the River Thames.

== History ==
Pimlico's development was started in 1835 by the landowner, the Marquess of Westminster, and the building was supervised by Thomas Cubitt who also designed the gardens. St George's Square was originally laid out in 1839 as two parallel streets running north–south but by 1843 had been developed into a formal square lined on two long sides and two sides of an angle in the north. It was London's first residential "square" open to the River Thames. In 1854 the first residents moved in. From the 1840s until 1874 the square had a pier, St George's Wharf, in latter decades its service expanded from watermen whose numbers were already low to steamers.

Its land was since 1722 in the parish of St George Hanover Square. It and the parish were named after the patron saint of England, Saint George.

In the small riverside garden, Pimlico Gardens, stands a stone statue by John Gibson of William Huskisson MP — the first widely reported person run over and killed by a railway engine. Huskisson wears a stone Roman senatorial toga. It was designed for the Royal Exchange and moved sites in 1915. The statue was described by Sir Osbert Sitwell as "boredom rising from the bath".

The Church of St Saviour (1864) stands at the north end of the square; it was designed by Thomas Cundy the Younger, surveyor for the Grosvenor estate. Next to it stands the church hall, housing the kindergarten that once employed Diana, Princess of Wales.

== Residents ==
The square has had many notable residents. The author Bram Stoker died at number 26 in April 1912, Dorothy L. Sayers lived in an unfurnished room for three months in 1920, the author and gamesman Stephen Potter lived at number 56 in 1924 while teaching at a crammer at number 68, William Makepeace Thackeray's eldest daughter Anne Ritchie made her home at number 109 from 1901 to 1912, and father of lawn tennis Walter Clopton Wingfield died at number 33 in April 1912.

== Today ==
The overall shape and Cubitt's buildings remain: four- and five-storey white stucco townhouses whose number has been reduced. More buildings are today on the east than west side, where a school ground occupies part. The townhouses are almost completely divided into apartments. Demographic replies to a survey of residents in 2007 were published by the local authority: 34% of residents were aged between 30 and 45 years and the dominant ethnic group self-identified as White British (75%).
