= Darbourne =

Darbourne may refer to:

- John Darbourne (1935–1991), British architect
- Darbourne & Darke, British firm of architects and landscape planners
