= Thomas Cundy =

Thomas Cundy may refer to one of three English architects, father, son and grandson:

- Thomas Cundy (senior) (1765–1825)
- Thomas Cundy (junior) (1790–1867)
- Thomas Cundy III (1821–1895)
