= St James the Less, Pimlico =

Coordinates: 51.4907°N 0.1353°W

- The Ecclesiastical Parish of St James-the-Less, Westminster
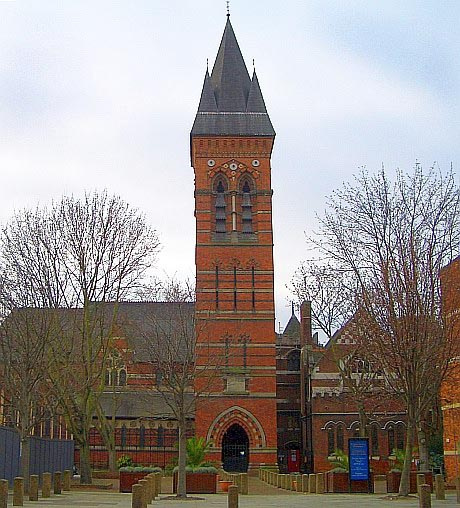
- The exterior of St. James the Less

- Location of the Church of St James the Less
- OS grid reference: TQ 295 784
- Location: 4 Moreton Street, Pimlico, Westminster, London SW1V 2PS
- Country: England
- Denomination: Church of England
- Churchmanship: Charismatic Evangelical
- Website: http://www.sjtl.org

History
- Status: Church
- Consecrated: 1861

Architecture
- Functional status: Active
- Heritage designation: Grade I – Listing 1066164
- Designated: 24 February 1958
- Architect: George Edmund Street
- Style: Gothic Revival with Lombardic influence
- Years built: 1858–61
- Completed: 31 July 1861

Specifications
- Capacity: 100–200
- Materials: Dark red brick with some black brick and stone dressings, slate roofs

Administration
- Archdiocese: Canterbury
- Diocese: London
- Archdeaconry: Charing Cross
- Deanery: Westminster St Margaret

Clergy
- Vicar: Reverend Lis Goddard

St James the Less is a Church of England parish church in Pimlico, Westminster, built in 1858–61 by George Edmund Street in the Gothic Revival style. A Grade I listed building, it has been described as "one of the finest Gothic Revival churches anywhere". The church was constructed predominantly in brick with embellishments from other types of stone. Its most prominent external feature is its free-standing Italian-style tower, while its interior incorporates design themes which Street observed in medieval Gothic buildings in continental Europe.

== History ==
The church was Street's first commission in London, which he took on after his widely admired work in the diocese of Oxford and at All Saints, Boyne Hill, Maidenhead, where he delivered buildings in polychromatic red brick and stone. He had also published in 1855, to considerable acclaim, his book Brick and Marble Architecture in Italy. In 1858, he was commissioned by the three daughters of the Bishop of Gloucester (James Henry Monk) to construct a church in their father's memory in what was, at the time, an area of slums and run-down tenements in a very poor part of London. The parish was inhabited by around 31,000 people at the time. The church, which stands on land formerly owned by Westminster Abbey, was consecrated in 1861. Street also built a parish school next to the church in 1861–64, in similar style, while his son Arthur Edmund Street revisited his father's designs in 1890 to add an infants' school (now a parish hall) attached to the west end of the church.

The church originally favoured the high church, Anglo-Catholic style of worship but over the decades became more of a broad church. By the time of its centenary, however, it faced closure due to dwindling numbers of worshippers. A campaign was mounted by Sir John Betjeman and others which resulted in the church gaining a reprieve. It was eventually united with the nearby church of St Saviour's, Pimlico. In the 21st century, it falls within the Charismatic Evangelical tradition.

St James the Less is now embedded in the centre of the Lillington Gardens estate, which was built around the church in three phases between 1964 and 1972. The estate replaced a 12-acre (4.9 ha) area of dilapidated stucco-fronted houses with a dense low-rise series of residential buildings, constructed with dark red brick cladding interspersed with concrete bands. The designers, Darbourne & Darke, set out specifically to complement the church and to avoid the use of precast concrete cladding, contemporary at the time, because they felt that it did not weather well in the British climate. The results were praised by the architectural critic Sir Nikolaus Pevsner, who wrote that the designers had chosen to ensure that "the architectural style of 1960 [is] proclaiming its appreciation of the style of 1860", which he considered "very gratifying to us committed Victorians." He declared the design of the estate to be "admirable in itself and admirable for its understanding of High Victorian values."

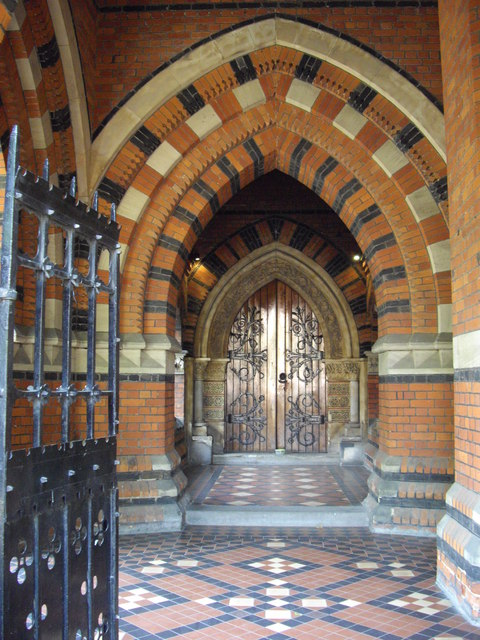
Polychromy in the campanile doorway

== Architecture ==
The church stands back from Vauxhall Bridge Road (from which it would not originally have been visible when built) and lies parallel to the road. It is constructed primarily from red bricks with an exterior embellished with black bricks, bands of Morpeth stone, voussoirs of coloured bricks and marble shafts. The steeply sloping roof is covered with slate, with a gable at one end and carried round the apse as a half-cone at the other end. The building is surrounded by cast-iron railings of Street's design, topped with wrought-iron crestings representing lilies. These were a last-minute addition inspired by the design of railings which closed-off the chapels within Barcelona Cathedral's cloister. They were made by James Leaver of Maidenhead in 1866.

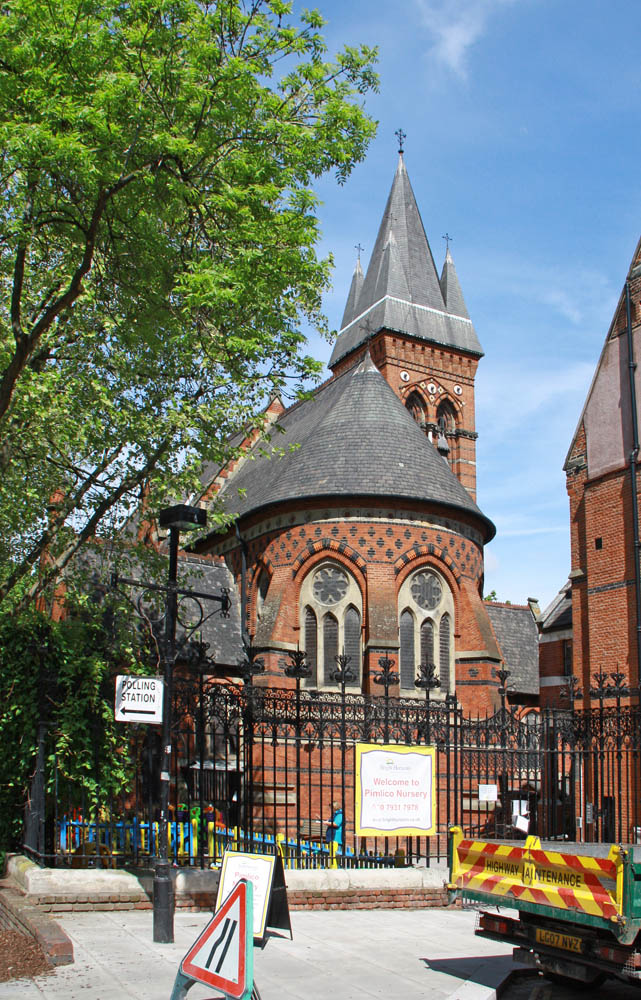
The apse under its half-conical slate roof

A columned porch and passage leads out towards the street. Above the porch is a free-standing tower reminiscent of an Italian campanile, an architectural feature that Street greatly admired ("there are no features of Italian buildings which are so universally remembered with pleasure"). The tower is topped by a spire whose bulk is emphasised by being corbeled out, giving the structure a somewhat top-heavy look. The spire is of an unconventional design, starting as a pyramid before splitting into a central spike flanked by four spirelets. Street had seen similar examples at Tournai in Belgium and at Genoa in Italy; it seems likely that he based that of St James the Less on the latter examples, which he described in a lecture delivered while he was working on the church.

The overall effect was quite unlike that of the traditional English church tower, but followed John Ruskin's prescription that "where the height of the tower itself is to be made apparent, it must be ... detached as a campanile" and "there must be one bounding line from base to coping." Street later wrote that this "breadth of effect" was "the very point which northern architects were most careless to succeed" and which, by implication, he sought to deliver in his churches. His tower at St James the Less was his most pronounced example of a free-styling campanile, though he built similar examples of solid, massive, freestanding towers at a number of other churches in England and Rome.

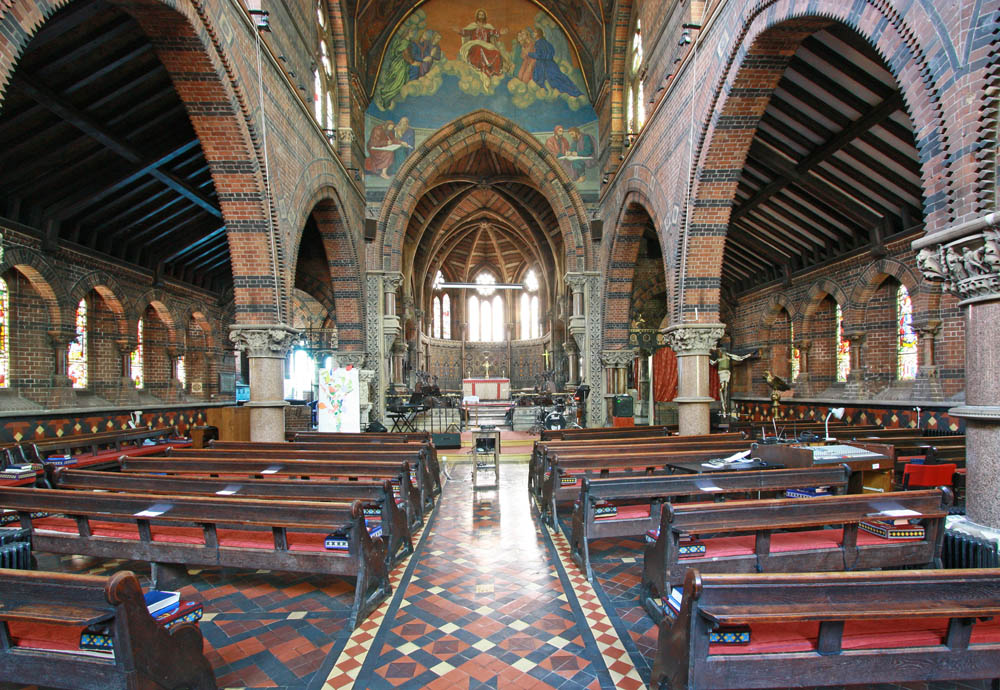
Interior of St James the Less

The church's interior has a broad aspect with three wide bays leading up to the apse. The walls are dominated by red brick, which is contrasted with black brick, mastic and red and yellow glazed tiles which link the floor to the lower walls. The nave is lined with short granite columns, each with carved capitals by W. Pearce, which support arcades of notched and moulded bricks. The capitals are illustrated with carvings of parables and miracles. At the clerestory end are three-light windows in the first two bays and plate tracery in the third. The chancel is separated from the nave by a prominent arch. Unlike the nave, it is groined in brick and is extensively decorated with mosaic and inlaid marble. The design of the sanctuary thus makes it a distinctively darker and more elaborately mysterious area of the church.

Many of the church's interior features were inspired by the architecture of churches in France, Italy and Germany. The columns and capitals reflect those of the chapter house and cloister of St-Georges de Boscherville near Rouen, while the vaulting is a reinterpretation of that in the church of St Jacques, Compiègne. St-Pierre in Paris's Montmartre district provided further inspiration.

The fittings of St James the Less are mostly original and were part of Street's vision for the church. A heavily carved pulpit was carved by Thomas Earp, though it is now somewhat battered. In 1861 George Frederic Watts provided a fresco of the Last Judgement known as "The Doom" above the chancel arch. He replaced it in the 1880s with a mosaic of Venetian glass made to the same design, after the original fresco had deteriorated. The church's stained glass was designed by Clayton and Bell and depicts various saints, including its patron St James the Less. The font is capped by an unusual domed iron canopy that was displayed at the 1862 International Exhibition.

== Critical views ==
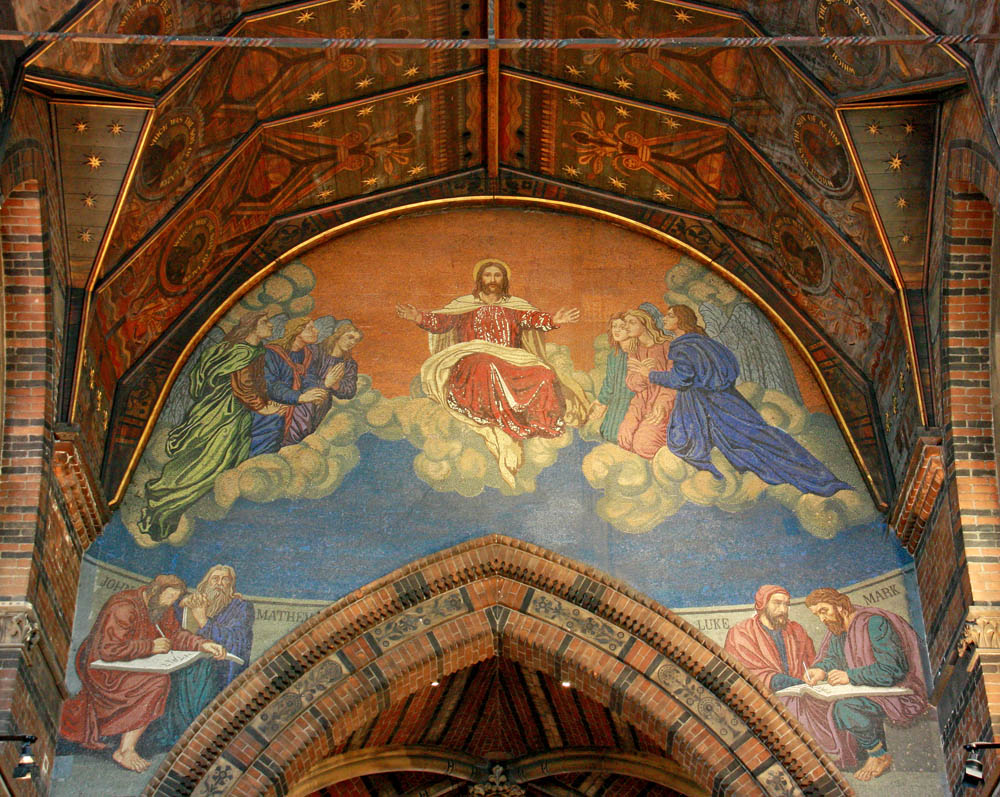
Mosaic of the Last Judgement, designed by George Frederic Watts

Although St James the Less is now highly regarded – Pevsner described it as "one of the finest Gothic Revival churches anywhere" – views of its merits were not uniformly positive at the time of its construction. The British Almanac and Companion for 1864 complained of how, for the current generation of church architects,

irregularity of outline seems now to be the guiding principle in designing a church, symmetry and simplicity the abiding terror of the Church architect. To avoid these, he will snip up the outside of his church into as many odd peaks and projections, and decorate it with as many 'bands', lines and dubious ornaments, as though he were a Nuremberg toy-maker.

The reviewer in The Ecclesiologist in 1861 was much more positive, however, commenting that Street had "stepped beyond the mere repetition of English mediaeval forms, to produce a building in which a free eclectic manipulation of parts has been grafted upon a system of polychromatic construction, having its basis on the fact that London is a brick town." The Illustrated London News contrasted the church with its impoverished surroundings, calling it "a lily among weeds".

Charles Eastlake, in his A History of the Gothic Revival (1872), declared that "the whole character of the building, whether we regard its plan, its distinctive external or internal decorations is eminently un-English". He was particularly fulsome in praise of its campanile-like tower, declaring that "if Mr. Street had never designed anything but the campanile of this church–and its Italian character justifies the name–it would be sufficient to proclaim him an artist. In form, proportion of parts, decorative detail, and use of colour, it seems to leave little to be desired." The church was no mere imitation of continental European forms either; as Street's son Arthur put it,

what is Italian has become so entirely absorbed in what belongs to the architect's own inspiration, that it is hard to put the finger on any actual features which recall Italian examples, the influence being traceable rather in the choice and management of materials, and the general massing of the block of buildings, than in any more specific points.

The church is a Grade I listed building. The separate parish rooms and school have an independent Grade I listing.
