= Belgrave Road =

Street in Pimlico, London

Coordinates: 51°29′34″N 0°08′35″W

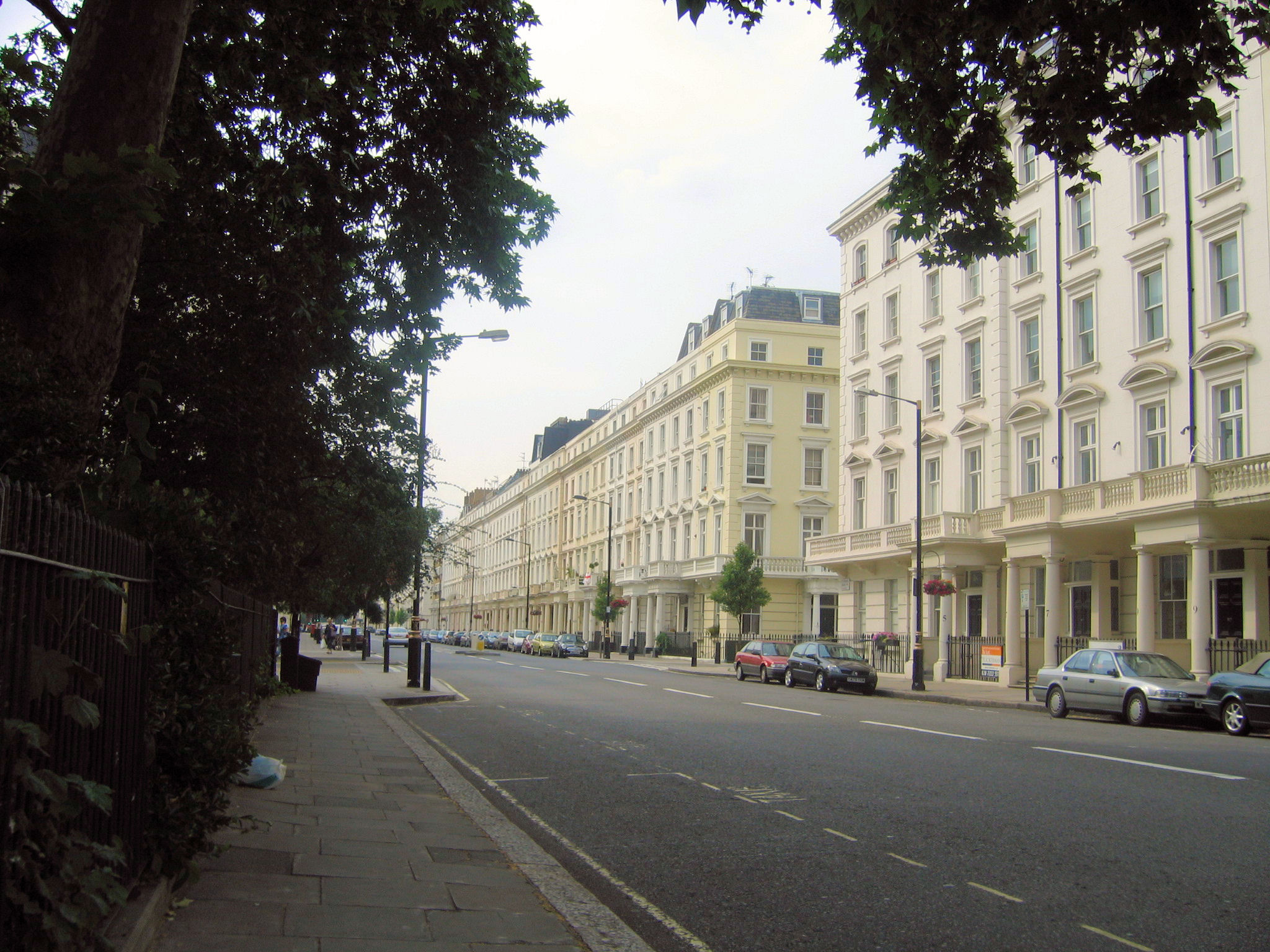
Belgrave Road

Belgrave Road is a street in London's Pimlico district. It is situated in the City of Westminster and runs between Eccleston Bridge to the northwest and Lupus Street to the southeast.

The street and the area were developed by Thomas Cubitt in the 1840s. Just off Warwick Square on the Belgrave Road end, Cubitt lived and worked from a large house he built there, which also served as the headquarters for his building firm.

There are three green spaces along its length, which is only 750 metres long. These are Eccleston Square, Warwick Square, and St George's Square.

Well over half of the buildings on Belgrave Road carry Grade II listed status due to their group value and historic character.

Belgrave Road is the home of two private schools. For the most part, both sides of the road are terraced stucco-fronted houses, giving the street an elegant appearance. Except where Warwick Way crosses Belgrave Road, there are no shops, and even at this crossing there is only a small convenience store and a public house, the Marquis of Westminster. At the northern end of the street, 11 Belgrave Road was built in the late 1950s as a modern office building replacing earlier Regency structures lost during the Second World War and was redeveloped in the early 2020s by the architects Eric Parry, who also worked on the nearby redevelopment of Chelsea Barracks.

== Bibliography ==
- Michael Leapman (editor), London – The evolution of a great city. Weidenfeld & Nicolson, 1989. ISBN 1-55584-370-0.
