= Eccleston Square Hotel =

Boutique hotel located in Pilmico, London

- Location within Greater London

General information
- Location: London, 37 Eccleston Square, London, England SW1V 1PB
- Coordinates: 51.49°N 0.15°W

Technical details
- Floor count: 5

Other information
- Number of rooms: 39
- Number of restaurants: 1
- Number of bars: 1

Website
- ecclestonsquarehotel.com

Eccleston Square Hotel is an independently owned boutique hotel located in Pimlico, London. The 39-room hotel is a small, independently-owned business housed in a renovated 19th-century Georgian Townhouse.

It has been referred to as Europe's most high-tech hotel by Condé Nast Traveler and featured as one of Five Hotels With Top-Notch Technology by Forbes.

== History ==
Eccleston Square Hotel is a Grade II listed building and was renovated over a period of one year at a cost of £6.5 million. The architectural and interior design work for the project was performed by Woods Bagot and opened in August 2011. The hotel is operated by Olivia Byrne and her brother James Byrne and is a member of Design Hotels.

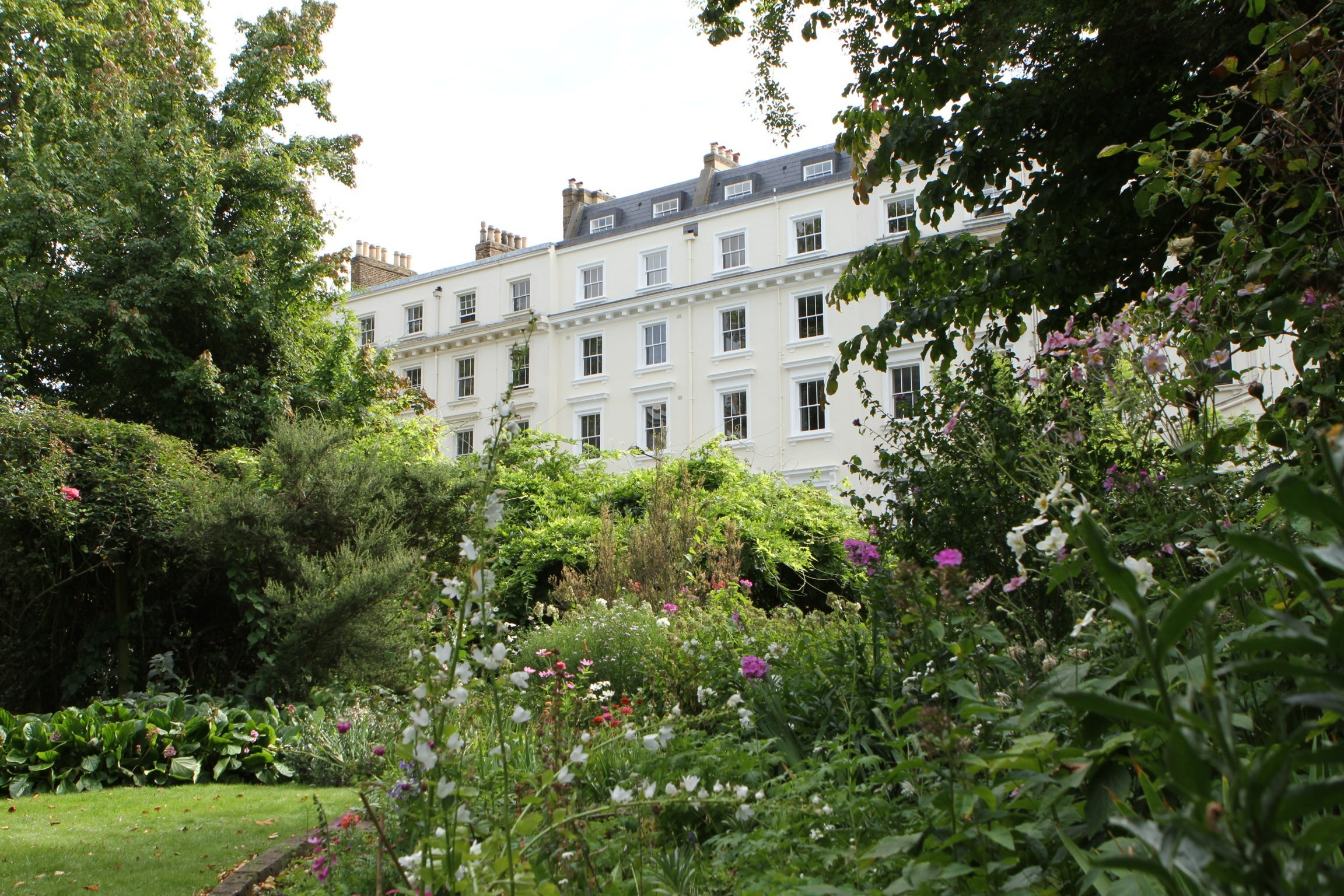
Photo taken from outside of the Eccleston Hotel in London.

== Reception ==
Six months after opening, Eccleston won the 2011 In-Room Technology Innovation award at the European Hospitality Awards.
