= Lillington Gardens =

Housing estate in Pimlico, London

Coordinates: 51.4909°N 0.1359°W

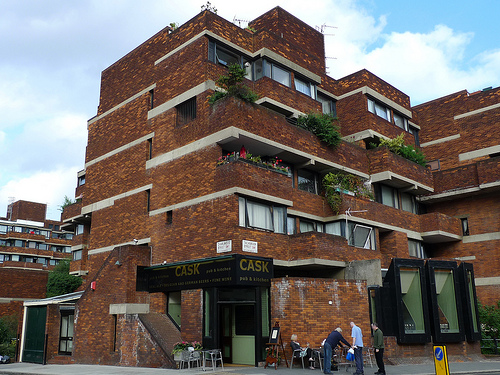
- A pub on the estate
- Interactive map of Lillington Gardens

Construction
- Architect: Roger Westman, John Darbourne, Geoffrey Darke

Lillington Gardens is an estate in the Pimlico area of the City of Westminster, constructed in phases between 1961 and 1971 to a plan by Darbourne & Darke. The estate was formerly owned and managed by CityWest Homes.

== Estate ==
The estate was among the last of the high-density public housing schemes built in London during the postwar period and is referred to as one of the most distinguished. Notably, seven years before the Ronan Point disaster ended the dominance of the tower block, Lillington Gardens looked ahead to a new standard that achieved high housing density within a medium-rise structure rather than a high-rise structure. It emphasised individuality in the grouping of dwellings and provided for private gardens at ground and roof levels.

The estate's high build quality, and particularly the planted gardens of its wide "roof streets", blend sympathetically with the surrounding Victorian terraces.

The estate's high-quality design was acknowledged by a Housing Design Award (1961), a Ministry of Housing and Local Government Award for Good Design (1970), a RIBA Award (1970), and a RIBA Commendation (1973). The architectural historian Nikolaus Pevsner described it in 1973 as "easily the most interesting recent housing in inner London".

The site surrounds the Grade I listed Church of St James the Less, built in 1859–61. The entire estate, including the church, was designated a conservation area in 1990.
