= Louisa Crow =

English writer (1826–1895)

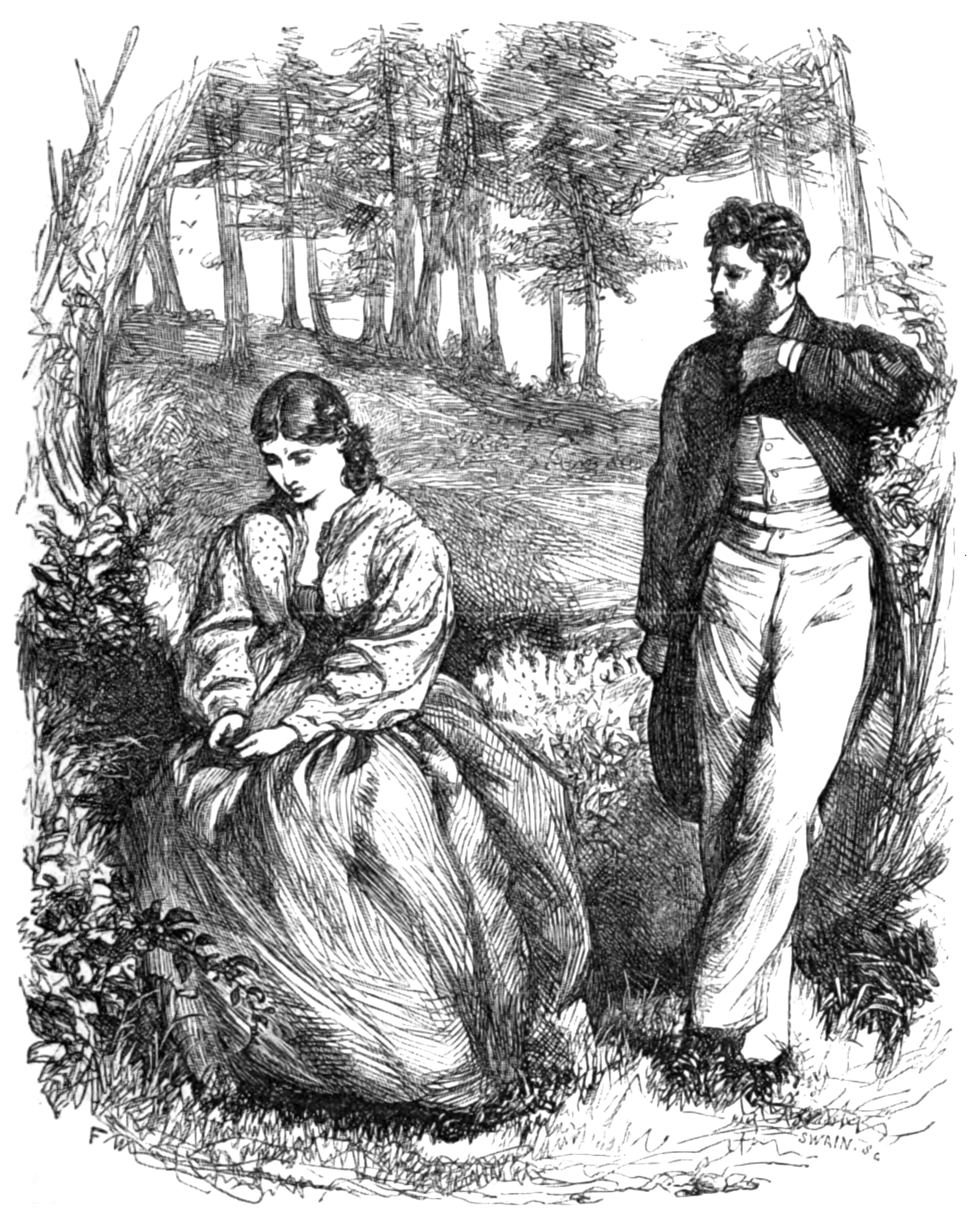
Illustration for Under the Fir-trees by Louisa Crow

Louisa Elizabeth Crow (née Fenn; 3 July 1826 – 1895) was a popular English writer of the 19th century. Her novels included An Honourable Estate, whilst her poetry and short stories featured in Once a Week and The Quiver. She was published for most of her career (1866 onward) at Bow Bells (London), after first publishing for John Dicks' cheap novel series.

== Biography ==
Louisa Elizabeth Fenn was born in Pimlico to parents Charles and Louisa. She married Stehen Crow, a carpenter and innkeeper, in 1848 and had several children. In 1895, she died of influenza in Farnham, "literally in harness after forty years' continuous production of a long series of novels."

== Bibliography ==
=== Novels ===
- A Twisted Link (1873)
- By Order of Queen Maude: A Story of Home Life (1887)
- Two Fates and a Fortune (1887)
- An Honourable Estate (1890)

=== Short stories ===
- "The Roadside Inn" in Once a Week (1861)
- "Within Twenty Miles of London in the Nineteenth Century" in Once a Week (1861)
- "Our Lodgers from Abroad" in Once a Week (1861)
- "The Blacksmith of Holsby" in Once a Week (1864)
- "Gracie North" in The Quiver (1872)
- "A Merrie Christmas" in The Fine Art Annual for 1873 (1872)
- "In Vanity and Vexation: A North Country Story" in The Quiver (1880)
- "Whither Drifting" in The Quiver (1882)
- "Mollie's Maidens" in The Quiver (1885)
- "For Conscience' Sake"
- "His Steadfast Purpose"
- "Lost in the Winning"

=== Poetry ===
- "Under the Fir-Trees: A Harvest Romance" in Once a Week (1861)
- ""An Hour with the Dead" in Once a Week (1861)
- "The Mill on the River Mole" in Once a Week (1861)
- "Richer Than Ever" in Once a Week (1861)
- "The Wild Flowers of Spring" in Once a Week (1862)
- "A Shadowed Life" in Once a Week (1862)
- "Twilight Dreams" in Once a Week (1863)
- "Seasonable Wooing" in Once a Week (1863)
- "On the River" in Once a Week (1863)
- "The Legend of Covenham Bridge" in Once a Week (1864)
- "The Bridal Eve" (1865)
- "Cassandra, of Troy" (1865)
- "Le Capitaine Paul" (1887)
