= St Saviour's, Pimlico =

Coordinates: 51.488558°N 0.135237°W

St Saviour's Church
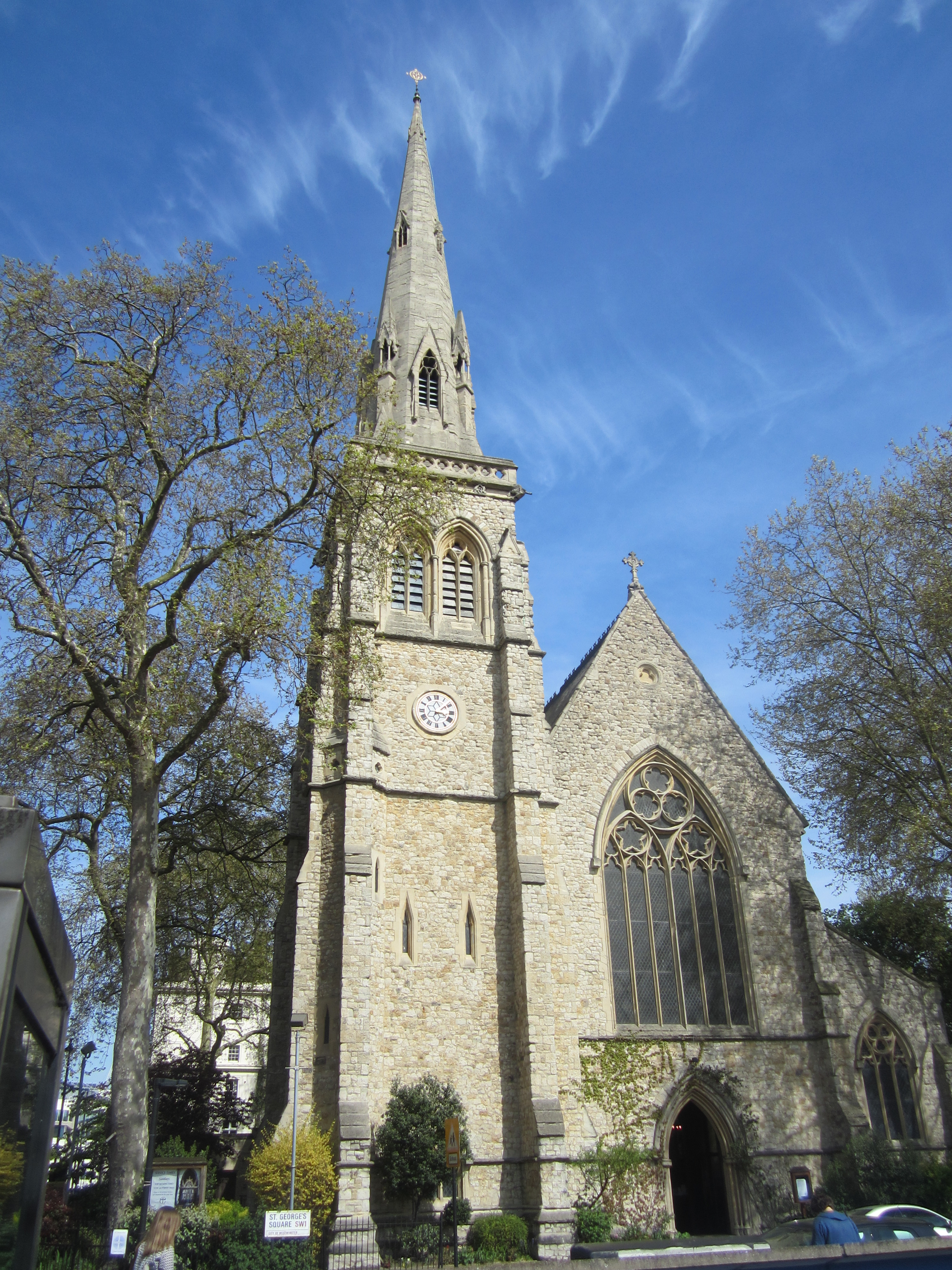
- St Saviour's Church
- Location: St George's Square, City of Westminster, London
- Country: England
- Denomination: Church of England
- Churchmanship: Anglo-Catholic
- Website: www.stsp.org.uk

History
- Status: Parish Church

Architecture
- Functional status: Active
- Architect: Thomas Cundy (Junior)
- Style: Gothic
- Years built: 1865

Administration
- Diocese: London
- Archdeaconry: Charing Cross
- Deanery: Westminster (St Margaret)
- Parish: St Saviour, Pimlico

Clergy
- Vicar: Fr Matthew Catterick

St Saviour's is an Anglo-Catholic church in Pimlico, City of Westminster, London, England, located at the north end of St George's Square. It was constructed in the 1860s as part of Thomas Cubitt's development of the area on behalf of the Marquess of Westminster. The church was designed by Thomas Cundy, who had previously built St Gabriel's Pimlico a short distance away. As with St Gabriel's, St Saviour's was designed in the Gothic style and built in ragstone to emphasise the contrast with the classical stucco of its secular neighbours. The church is Grade II listed.

== History ==
=== Building ===
The foundation stone was laid on 16 June 1863 and the church was consecrated on 16 July 1864. At 170 feet (51.8m) high, the spire was at the time one of the tallest in London. At that time, the church interior looked rather bare. There were two long galleries extending from the chancel to the west end and there was no screen or pulpit, just a small brass lectern.

In 1871, the present organ by Hill & Son was installed. In 1882, there was a major restoration called by a former churchwarden "the beautifying of the church": the galleries were removed, the arcade work was added to the sanctuary and the East window filled with stained glass. This work was made possible by the generosity of the parishioners (the sum of £1,500 being collected) and the supervision of the work by Romaine Walker himself. Further stained glass windows were completed after 1882 and pictures added.

==== Sanctuary ====
The reredos depicts the Last Supper and was designed by Romaine Walker, the son of the first Vicar, 1882, and carved by Thomas Earp. The East window, also designed by Romaine Walker, shows Christ in Majesty; by Clayton and Bell (c. 1880). The oak rood screen was added in 1911.

==== Lady Chapel ====
The baldacchino was added in 1913, by Nicholson and Corlette.

==== Side chapel ====
The side chapel contains the Mission Altar (c 1910), originally in the old Mission Hall in Aylesford St. Above the altar the screen, originally in the Lady Chapel, is believed to be by Nicholson and Corlette.

==== Font ====
The font was also designed by Romaine Walker. The oak spire was added in 1885.

=== Turn of the 20th century ===
Between 1887 and 1912, a number of new additions were made which can be seen today. The side chapel was blessed in 1889, the sanctuary was decorated in 1891 and the clock placed in the tower in 1895. In 1911, the coronation year of King George V, the church was specially cleaned and the steeple repaired at a cost of £250. The vicar at this active time was Henry Washington. His life and ministry are commemorated by two stained glass windows, the chancel screen (erected in 1913) and the oak pulpit.

In 1914 C. O. Merritt Fox, a churchwarden, published a history of St Saviour's. He concluded his book by saying:

people of the present day ... owe a great deal to the men and women of the earlier date, who did so much by stirring up enthusiasm about Church matters, and contributing liberally of their time and money to build churches, work the parishes, and level up the religious standard of the day. How can we show our gratitude for their efforts better than giving in like manner our services and our money, and in every possible way supporting the parochial organizations and the work which the Clergy are carrying on in our parish at the present time”.

In the 1930s the statues of the Madonna and Child (after Michelangelo), the Sacred Heart and the Stations of the Cross were shipped from Oberammergau and added to the church.

=== 1990s to present ===
In 1999 the south wall was cleaned and repaired and extensive areas of damaged plaster-work were restored. The church was also completely redecorated. In the course of this work the full extent of the decorative panels of the chancel ceiling was uncovered. These panels were cleaned and restored. The lady chapel has been reinstated in the south chancel-transept and the nave transepts were cleared of unwanted pews in order to create a feeling of spaciousness throughout the building. In 2007 the Pimlico Room, parish office and sacristy were renovated and restored. The Pimlico Room had been subsiding; this was attended to, and toilets added. A mezzanine was installed in the sacristy to allow for more space for both office and sacristy. In 2016 a number of major restoration began to take shape, including a new Nave roof (including authentic polychromatic tiling, a complete rewiring and relighting of the whole building, and the restoration of the 1870s organ built by William Hill. St Saviour's is open all day, five days a week and is a welcoming and inspiring space for all.

== Notable past parishioners ==
During its history St Saviour's has been associated with a number of notable people. The first Duke of Westminster erected the church at his own expense, with George Cubitt, descendant of the builder of much of Pimlico. Recently the 6th Duke of Westminster has acted as Patron of Saint Saviour's Restoration Appeal. Laurence Olivier’s father, Gerard Kerr Olivier, was a curate at St Saviour’s and Lord Olivier was a choirboy and altar server. The founder of modern lawn tennis, Walter Clopton Wingfield, was a regular worshipper and the writer Sir Compton Mackenzie was married in the church.

== Church hall ==
St Saviour’s church hall is situated alongside the south wall. The hall is in use nearly every day of the week and is home to the Young England Kindergarten where Lady Diana Spencer worked before her marriage to the Prince of Wales. Following her death, a tree was planted and a bench seat added in her memory.

== Gallery ==
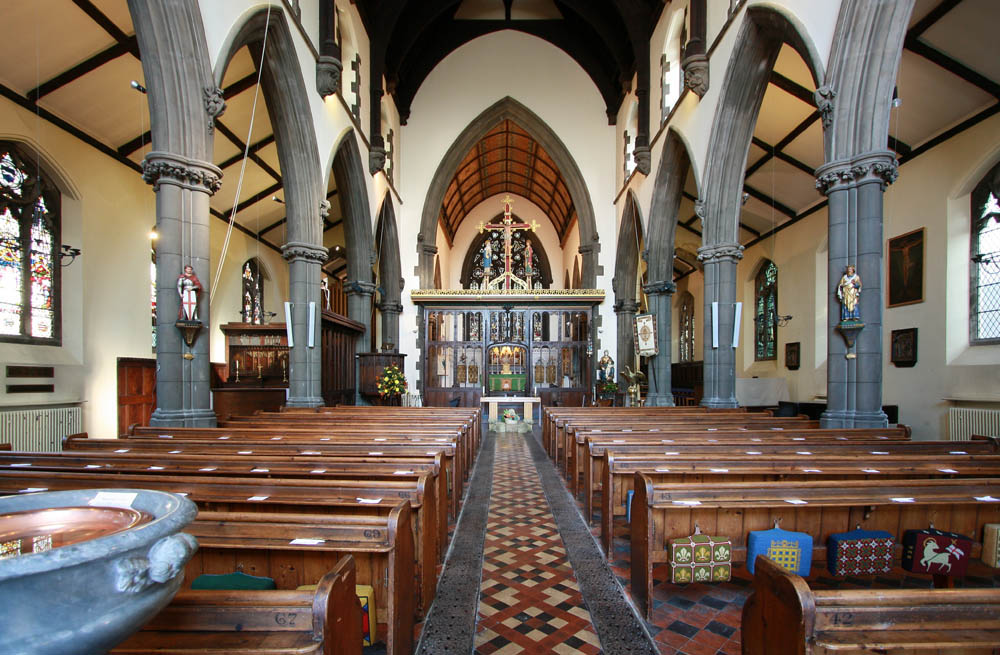
Nave

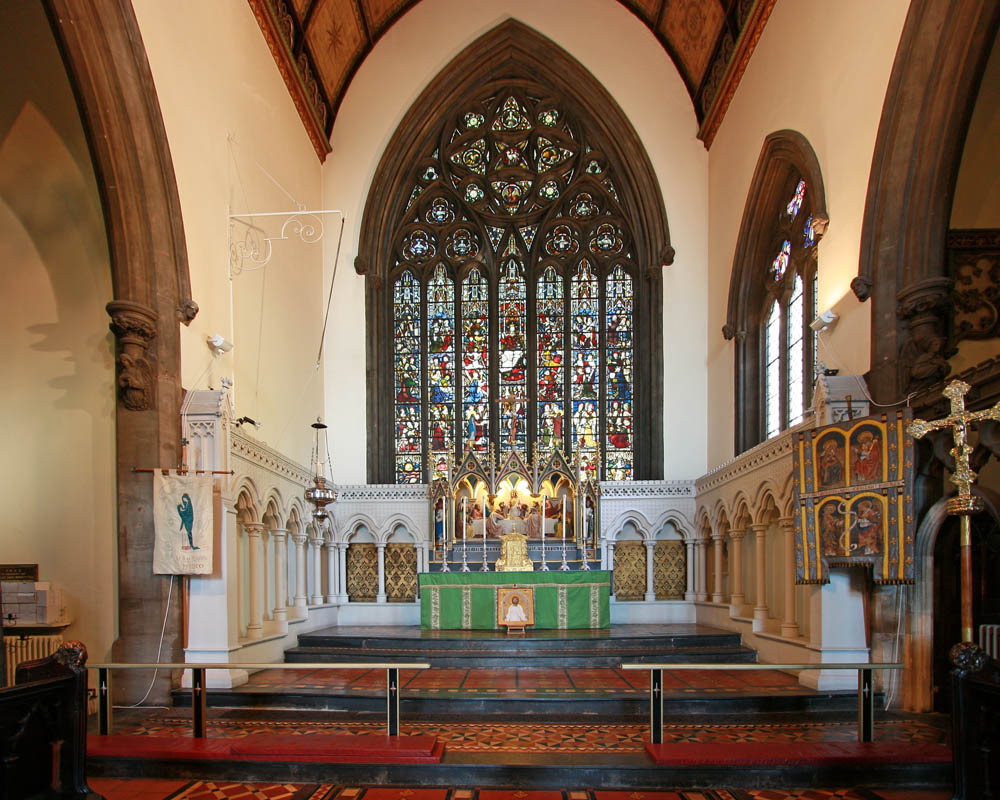
Sanctuary

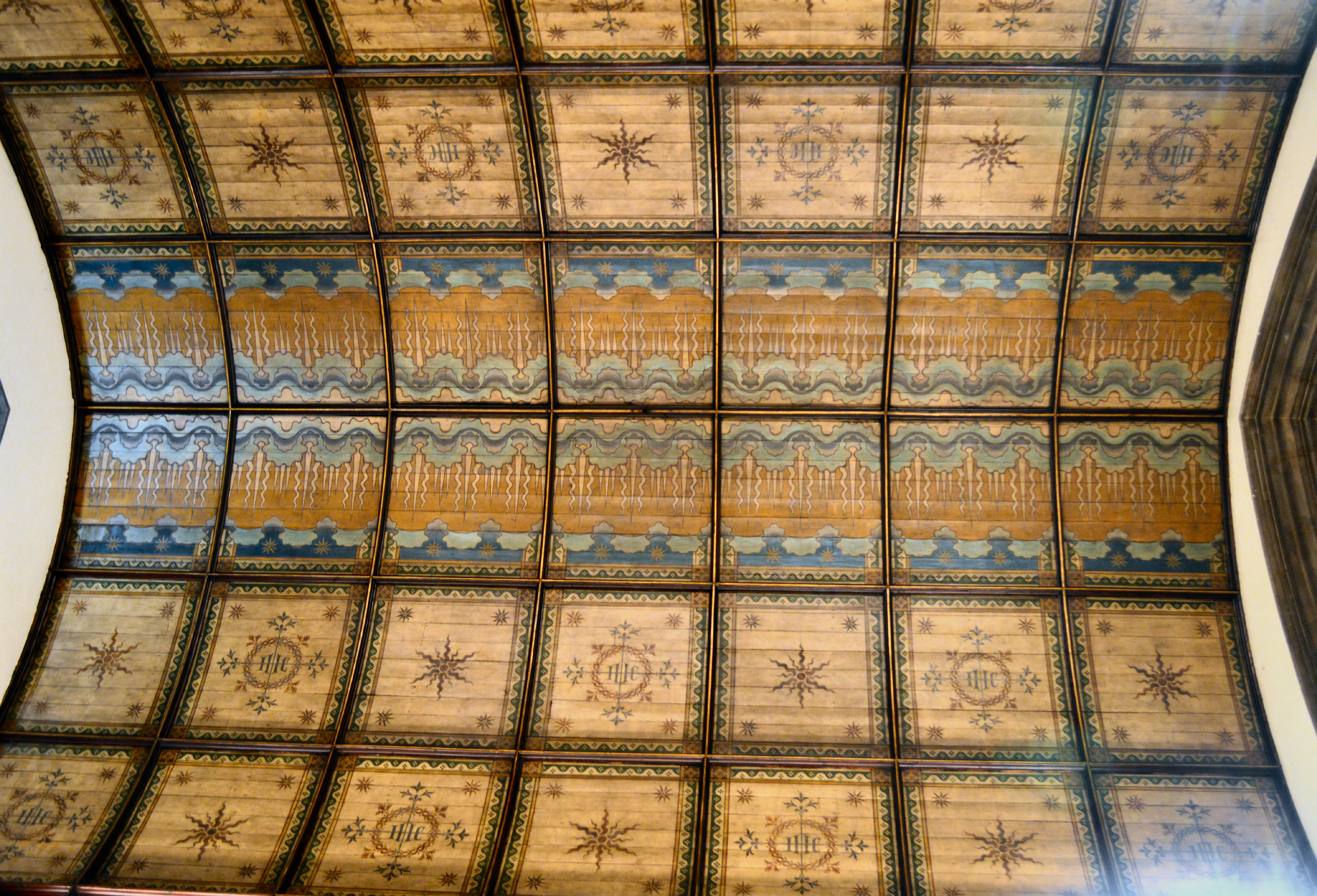
The painted ceiling
