= Darbourne & Darke =

British architectural firm

Practice information
- Key architects: John Darbourne; Geoffrey Darke
- Founded: 1961
- Dissolved: 1987

Significant works and honors
- Buildings: Lillington Gardens

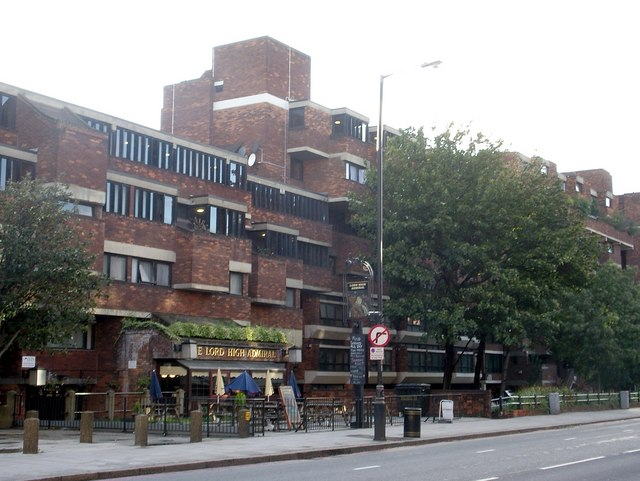
The Lord High Admiral, Pimlico and Charlwood House

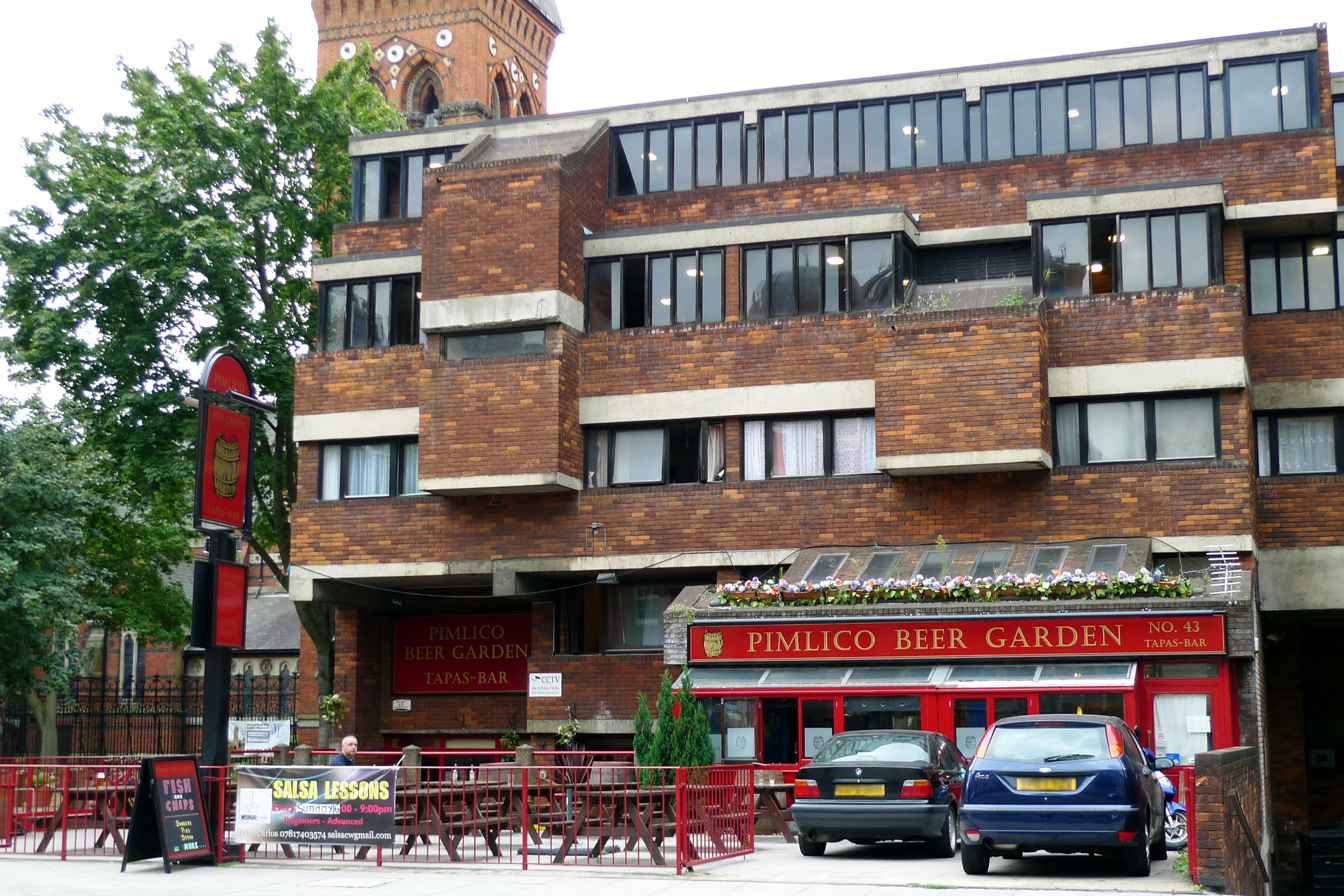
Later Pimlico Beer Garden

Darbourne & Darke was a firm of architects and landscape planners. Though their work includes a football stand (for Chelsea Football Club, London, 1972–74), laboratories and offices, and the landscaping (1976–77) of much of Heathrow Airport, London, the firm's most notable output was in the realm of public housing.

The firm was founded to design the Lillington Gardens estate in the Pimlico area of Westminster, London. Having won the competition, John Darbourne returned to Britain, and with Geoffrey Darke opened a practice from an office in the nearby Churchill Gardens estate.

Lillington Gardens, constructed in phases between 1961 and 1972, was a resounding success, breaking with the then current use of standard units in high-rise blocks. Instead, it emphasised individuality in the grouping of dwellings, provided for private gardens at ground and roof levels, and achieved high densities with blocks of only eight stories.

The firm's later (1966–67) project at Marquess Road, Islington, London, developed an equally difficult urban site on similar stylistic lines, with family maisonettes with gardens at ground level and smaller flats above, fronted by wide 'roof streets' with space for planting.

Simons House, a retirement home on Histon Road in the north of Cambridge, was designed by the firm and built in 1977.

The work of Darbourne & Darke was the subject of an exhibition at the Royal Institute of British Architects Heinz Gallery in the summer of 1977. Darbourne and Darke went on to undertake work in both the UK and abroad - notably several schemes in Germany and Italy, through competition wins (Hanover, Stuttgart and Gifhorn, in Germany, and Bolzano in Italy). Although their main work was in public housing they undertook many public and commercial buildings, winning a number of Civic Trust and RIBA awards, culminating in the prestigious Fritz Schumacher international award for "Services to Architecture" (1972) an award usually given to statesmen, scientists, writers, artists and musicians.

They designed the Lord High Admiral, a public house at 43 Vauxhall Bridge Road, Pimlico, London, which was built in 1964-67 as part of Lillington Gardens, and the interior fitted out 1968-99. It was Grade II* listed in 1998, and is attached to Charlwood House, also Grade II* listed. The building later became a restaurant.

The partnership was dissolved in October 1987, with both Darbourne and Darke setting up separate practices.
