= Thomas Cundy (senior) =

English architect

Thomas Cundy, the elder (1765 – 28 December 1825) was an English architect. Surveyor to the Grosvenor family's London estates from 1821, he was involved in the initial stages of the development of Belgravia and Bloomsbury, and also designed country houses in a picturesque Gothic style.

== Life ==
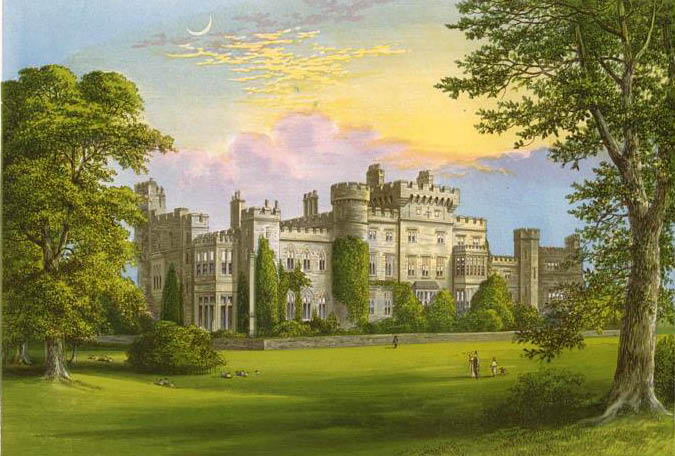
Hawarden Castle, as shown in an illustration of 1880

He was the eldest son of Peter Cundy of Restowrick House, St Dennis Cornwall, and his wife Thomasine Wilcocks, and was baptised at St Dennis on 18 February 1765.

After serving an apprenticeship with a builder in Plymouth, he moved to London at the age of 21. At the age of 28 he was employed as clerk of the works at Normanton Park, under Samuel Pepys Cockerell; following Cockerell's retirement he was retained by Sir Gilbert Heathcote to complete the alterations in progress. He then set up in business as an architect and builder, and in 1821 was appointed surveyor to Earl Grosvenor's London estates, in succession to William Porden. He had previously altered two houses on the estate, in Grosvenor Square. During his tenure the basic layout of Belgravia was developed, but he died before much construction had been carried out.

Buildings which Cundy built or altered significantly include Middleton Park and Osterley for the Earl of Jersey, Tottenham Park in Wiltshire, Hawarden Castle, Burton Constable, Syon House, Northumberland House in London and Wytham in Oxfordshire. He exhibited several designs for these and other buildings at the Royal Academy.

He died 28 December. 1825. He is buried in the Vineyard Cemetery in Richmond, Surrey. His son, Thomas Cundy the younger, took over his post with the Grosvenor estate.

== Family ==
Cundy married Mary Hubert in 1789. They had six sons: Thomas (1790–1867), also an architect; James (1793–1826, a mason); Samuel (c. 1794-1819); Joseph (1795–1875, an architect and builder); William (c. 1797-1829); and John (c. 1802-28).

== Works ==
Buildings on which Cundy worked included:

- Middleton Park, Oxfordshire. Restored the house for the 5th Earl of Jersey in 1806-10.
- Osterley Park (for the Earl of Jersey).
- Tottenham Park, Wiltshire.
- Hawarden Castle. Cundy enlarged an existing house for Sir Stephen Richard Glynne, entirely casing the building in ashlar, in a castellated Gothick style in 1809-10.
- Burton Constable.
- Syon House.
- Northumberland House. Cundy designed a grand marble staircase, built in 1822–3.
- Wytham, Oxfordshire.
- Wassand House, Seaton, Yorkshire, built in 1813-19 for the Rev. Charles Constable.

== Sources ==
- H. M. Colvin, A Biographical Dictionary of British Architects, 1600–1840 (1997) ISBN 0-300-07207-4
- L. H. Cust, ‘Cundy, Thomas, the elder (1765–1825)’, rev. Annette Peach, Oxford Dictionary of National Biography, Oxford University Press, 2004, accessed 3 January 2008
- A Biographical Dictionary of Civil Engineers in Great Britain and Ireland : 1500-1830 A. W. Skempton
