= St Gabriel's Church, Pimlico =

Grade II* listed church in London

Coordinates: 51.4897°N 0.142286°W

St Gabriel's, Pimlico
- Parish Church of St Gabriel, Warwick Square
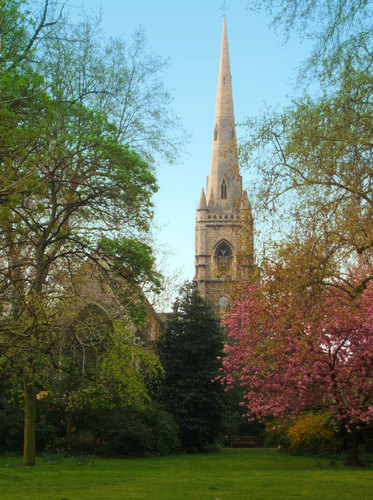
- St Gabriel's, Pimlico
- Country: England
- Denomination: Church of England
- Churchmanship: Traditional Catholic
- Website: https://www.stgabrielspimlico.org.uk/

History
- Founded: 1851
- Dedication: Gabriel the Archangel

Architecture
- Heritage designation: Grade II*
- Designated: 1958
- Architect: Thomas Cundy (junior)
- Style: Gothic

Administration
- Diocese: London
- Archdeaconry: Charing Cross
- Deanery: Westminster (St Margaret)
- Parish: St Gabriel, Warwick Square

Clergy
- Bishop: Rt Revd Jonathan Baker (AEO)
- Vicar: Fr Owen Higgs SSC

St Gabriel's, Pimlico is an Anglo-Catholic parish church of the Church of England located in Warwick Square, Pimlico, London. It lies within the Deanery of Westminster (St Margaret) within the Diocese of London. Designed by Thomas Cundy (junior), it was constructed between 1851 and 1853 as part of Thomas Cubitt's development of the area on behalf of the Marquess of Westminster. It is a Grade II* listed building.

== History ==
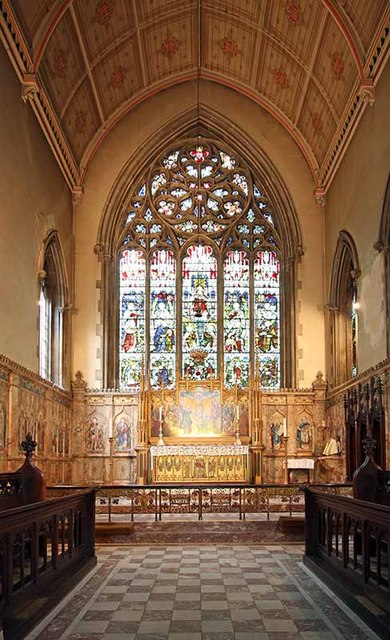
Church interior, St Gabriel's Church, Warwick Square

The church was built between 1851 and 1853 by Thomas Cundy (junior). In the period 1840–60, Pimlico was a rapidly expanding residential area and the Marquess of Westminster, the major local landowner, granted £5,000 and the freehold of a plot at the south-western end of Warwick Square for a church. The vestry was added in 1887-8 by James Piers St Aubyn.

== Description ==
Immediately following all this work came a period of improvements in the chancel, funded in the main by Lord Edward Pelham-Clinton. A new high altar had been installed, designed by John Francis Bentley, architect of Westminster Cathedral, and now the whole chancel was lined with alabaster and with Italianate mosaic designs by James Powell and Company in 1897. The floor is of red and white marble squares with solid marble steps. Particularly prominent was the new East Window by Charles Eamer Kempe depicting Christ in Glory with Saints.

== Lady chapel ==
The lady chapel was added to the south of the chancel and some of the original reredos (thought to be by George Gilbert Scott) from the original high altar, installed there.

== Sources ==
- Bradley, Simon; Pevsner, Nikolaus (2003). London 6: Westminster. The Buildings of England. Yale University Press. ISBN 9780300095951.
