= Thomas Cundy (junior) =

English architect

Thomas Cundy the younger (1790 – 15 July 1867) was an English architect, son of another architect of the same name. He joined his father's practice and ultimately succeeded his father as surveyor of the Grosvenor Estate, and held the position during the main phase of the development of Belgravia and Pimlico by the contractor Thomas Cubitt.

== Life ==
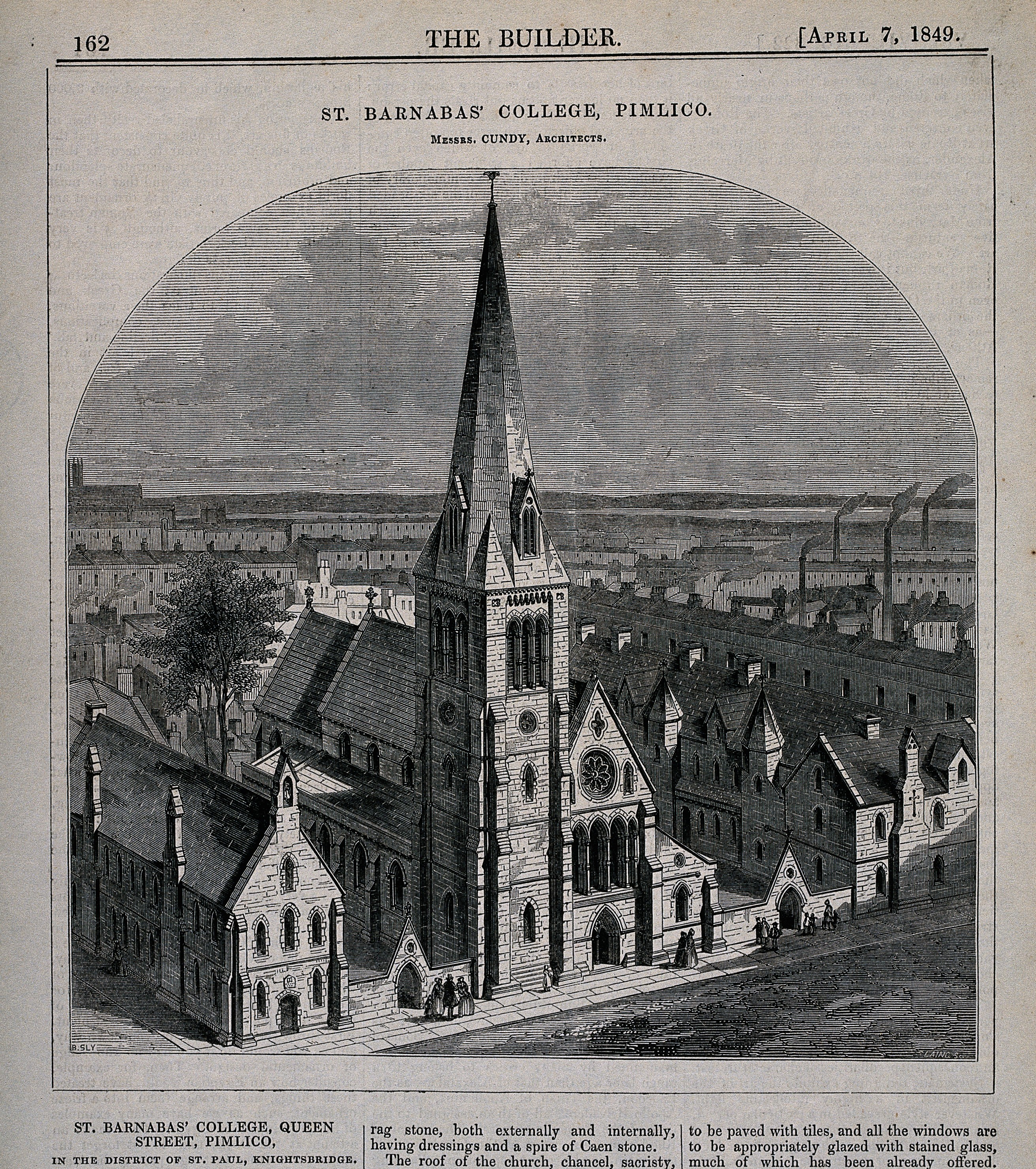
Church of St Barnabas, Pimlico.

He was eldest son of Thomas Cundy and his wife Mary Hubert. He worked with his father on many projects, and, following his father's death in 1825 took over his practice, and his position as surveyor to Lord Grosvenor's London estates. He held this position for 41 years, covering the entire period of Thomas Cubitt's speculative developments.

The buildings he designed or alterered included Hewell Grange; Tottenham Park; Moor Park, Hertfordshire, (alterations for Earl Grosvenor in 1828 and 1831); Fawsley Park and Grosvenor House. He also designed St Matthew's Church, Normanton, Rutland (1826).

In later years he worked mostly on building churches on the west side of London, including Holy Trinity Paddington, St Paul's, Knightsbridge, and St Barnabas's, St Michael's, St Saviour's and St Gabriel's, Pimlico. St Barnabas was built to suit the high church tendency, with a richly decorated interior and a screen separating nave from chancel. It forms part of a unified scheme, with schools and a parsonage in the same Early English style: Charles Locke Eastlake commented that the parsonage "was probably the first instance in which a Victorian drawing-room received its light from a lancet window."

Cundy lived at Bromley in Kent in his later years, and died on 15 July 1867, aged 77. He left three sons and one daughter from his marriage to Arabella Fishlake of Salisbury. His third son, the third Thomas Cundy, took over the business.

He was buried in Brompton Cemetery, London.

== Works ==
=== Houses ===
- Hewell Grange
- Tottenham Park
- Moor Park, Hertfordshire
- Fawsley Hall
- The picture gallery at Grosvenor House (1826–7), the London residence of the Duke of Westminster. In 1842–3 he added a screen to front the courtyard towards Upper Grosvenor Street.

=== Churches ===
- St Matthew's Church, Normanton, Rutland (1826)
- St Michael's, Chester Square (1846)
- St Barnabas, Pimlico (1847–50)
- St Mark's, Hamilton Terrace (1846–7), tower built by his son
- Holy Trinity, Paddington
- St Paul's Church, Knightsbridge
- St Gabriel's, Warwick Square
- St Saviour's, Pimlico
