= Eccleston Square =

Residential square in London, England

Coordinates: 51°29′32″N 0°08′39″W

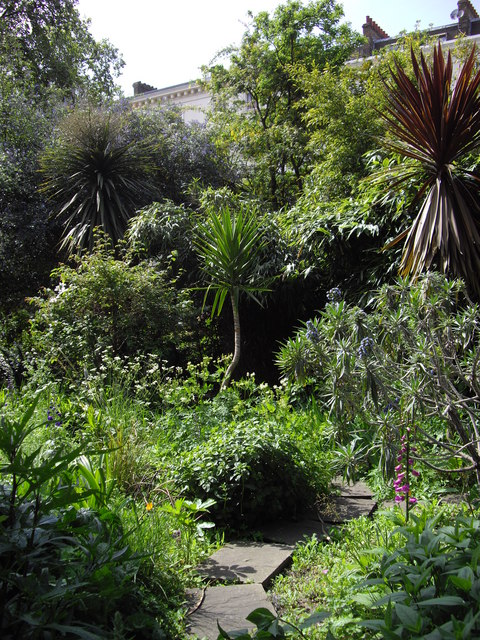
Eccleston Square gardens, 2009

Eccleston Square is a square in Pimlico, London.

== History ==
The square dates to the 1830s, an integral part of Thomas Cubitt's planned design of "South Belgravia", which is now called Pimlico. Cubitt designed many of the houses on the square and built and leased Nos 1–3 in 1836 and Nos 4 and 5 in 1842 all of which are grade II listed with English Heritage. The land was formerly part of the Grosvenor family estate, who owned land in Eccleston, Cheshire, from where it is thought the square takes its name.

The communal private gardens in the centre of the square are grade II listed with English Heritage since 1987, and open for the National Gardens Scheme each year.

The Buddhist Society has been based at no.58 since 1956.

There are two blue plaques in the square. The first is for Winston Churchill, who moved to Eccleston Square a year after marrying Clementine Hozier, and their first two children, Diana and Randolph, were born there.

The second blue plaque is for the conductor and orchestra reformer Sir Michael Costa, who lived at Wilton Court, 59 Eccleston Square, from 1857 to 1883.

The Eccleston Square Hotel is a grade II listed building at no.37.

== Notable residents ==
=== Blue plaques ===
- Sir Winston Churchill, politician – lived at 33 Eccleston Square
- Sir Michael Costa, conductor and orchestra reformer – lived at Wilton Court, 59 Eccleston Square

=== Others ===
- Douglas Douglas-Hamilton, 14th Duke of Hamilton, born at no.71
- James Erskine (Conservative politician), lived at no.7
- Adolphus FitzGeorge, admiral, died at no.20
- Bertha Jane Grundy, novelist, died in Eccleston Square in 1912
- Alfred Hillier, Conservative MP, died by suicide in 1911 in his home at no.20
- Richard Hull (author), crime novelist, died at no.32 in 1973
- Field Marshal Sir William Robertson, 1st Baronet, Chief of the Imperial General Staff
- Harold Rutland, music critic, lived at no.27 in the 1960s and 1970s
- Patrick Swift, Irish artist
- William Watson-Armstrong, 1st Baron Armstrong, born at no.65
- Humbert Wolfe, poet, died at no.75
