= Geoffrey Darke =

Geoffrey James Darke (1 September 1929 – 8 November 2011) was a British architect, who together with fellow architect John Darbourne, founded Darbourne & Darke in 1961. When the partnership was dissolved in October 1987, Darke set up his own company known as Geoffrey Darke Associates, based in central London.

Darke died on 8 November 2011, aged 82.
