= John Darbourne =

British architect

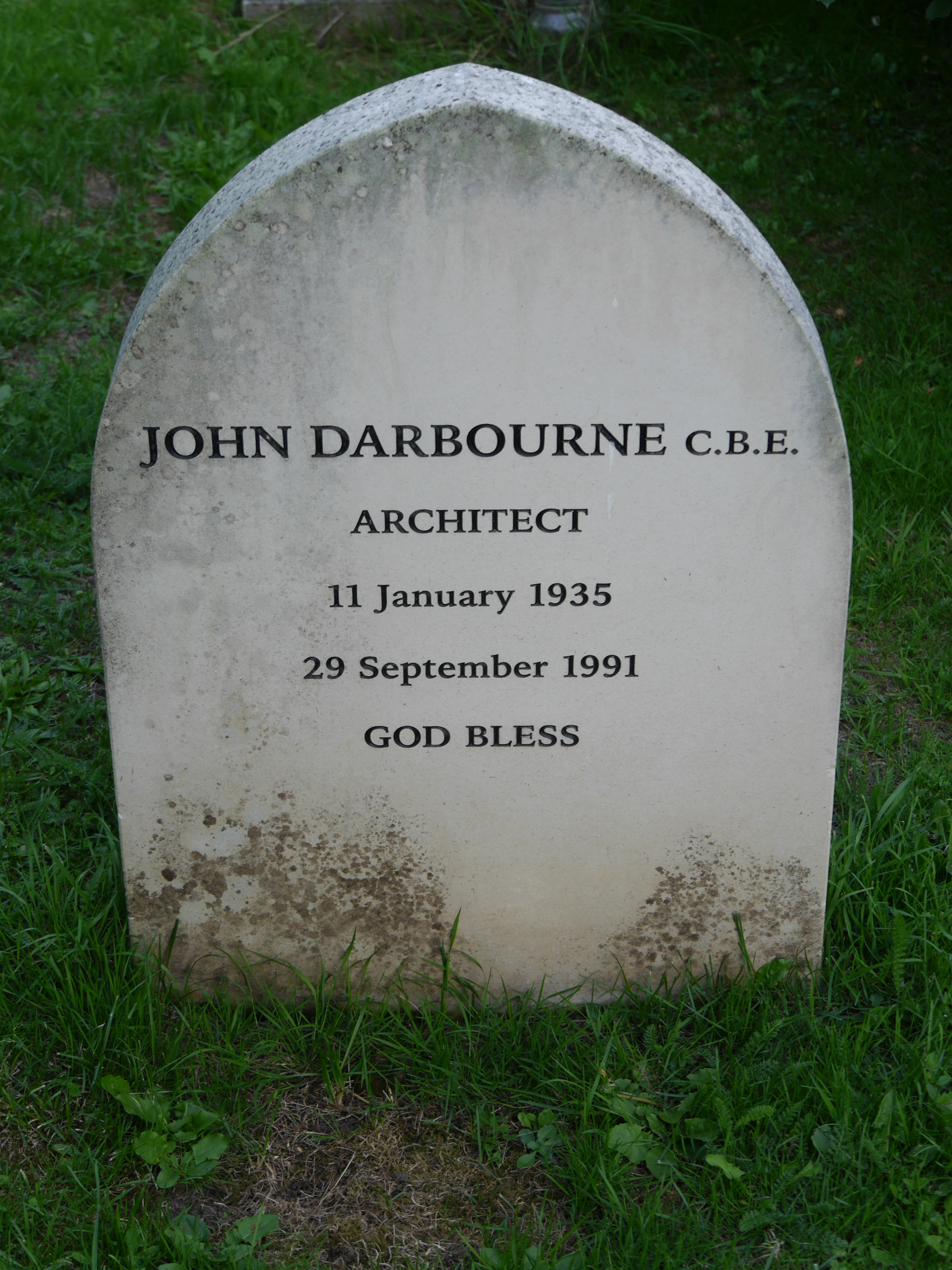
Funerary monument, St Peter's Church, Petersham

John William Charles Darbourne CBE (11 January 1935 – 29 September 1991) was a British architect, who together with fellow architect Geoffrey Darke, founded Darbourne & Darke in 1961.

He attended Battersea Grammar School in Streatham, South London.

In 1961 Darbourne won a housing competition for his plans for the Lillington Gardens estate in Westminster, London, his later work including designing a stand for Chelsea Football Club at Stamford Bridge and the landscaping of Heathrow Airport. In October 1987 the Darbourne & Darke partnership was dissolved and Darbourne set up his own company known as Darbourne & Partners Ltd, based in Richmond, London. The Lillington Gardens scheme pioneered low-rise, high-density public housing and was widely imitated, influencing the style of council housing in Britain from the mid-1960s until the early 1980s.

Darbourne was appointed Commander of the Order of the British Empire in the 1977 New Years Honours for his services to architecture.

Darbourne died on 29 September 1991, aged 56.
