= Lupus Street =

London street

Lupus Street is a street in Pimlico, central London.

No. 22 was home to the actor Laurence Olivier from the age of five to 12, and a blue plaque was installed there in June 2026.
