= Pimlico =

Area of Central London, England

Coordinates: 51.4887°N 0.1395°W

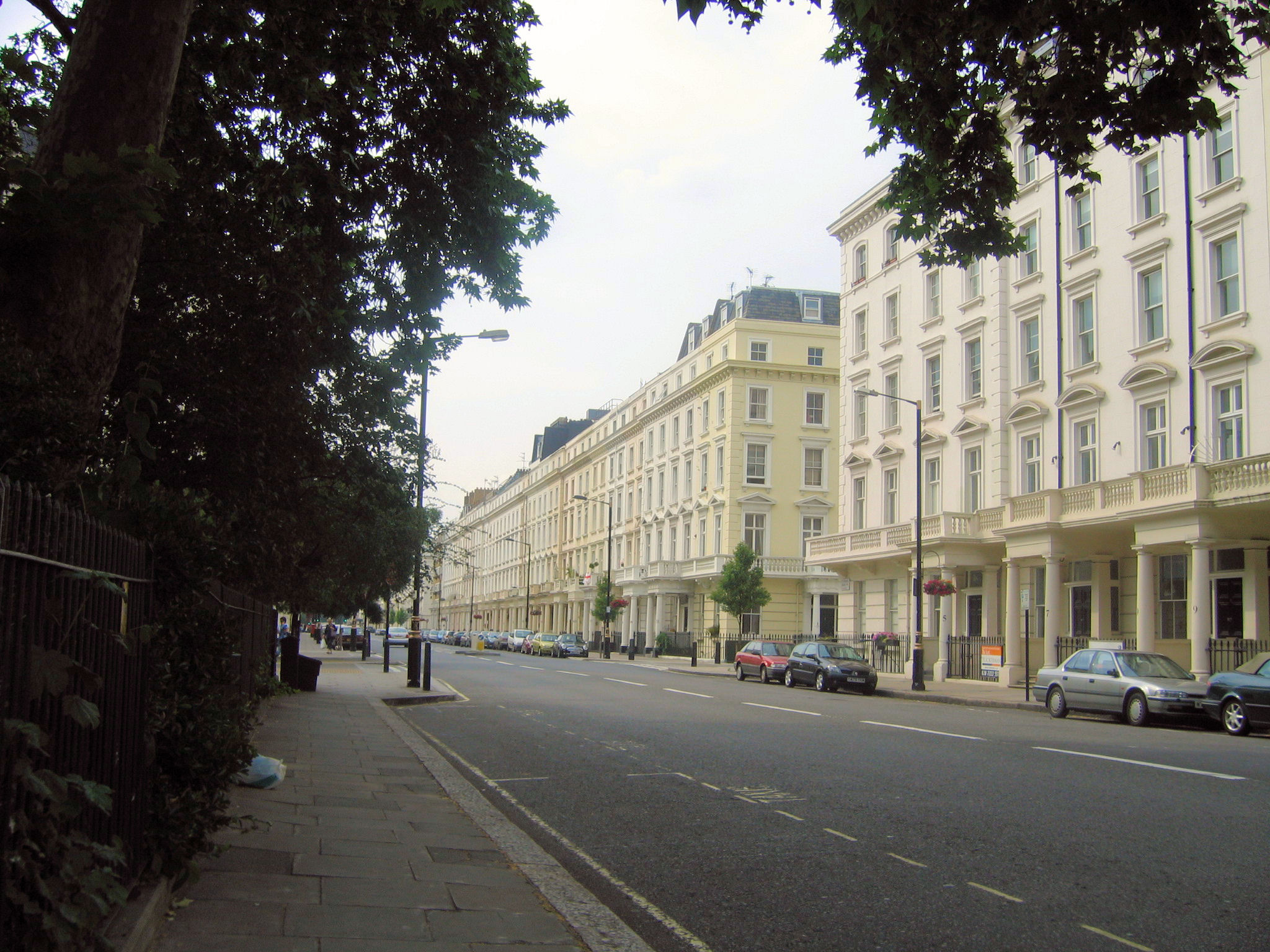
- Belgrave Road from St George's Square

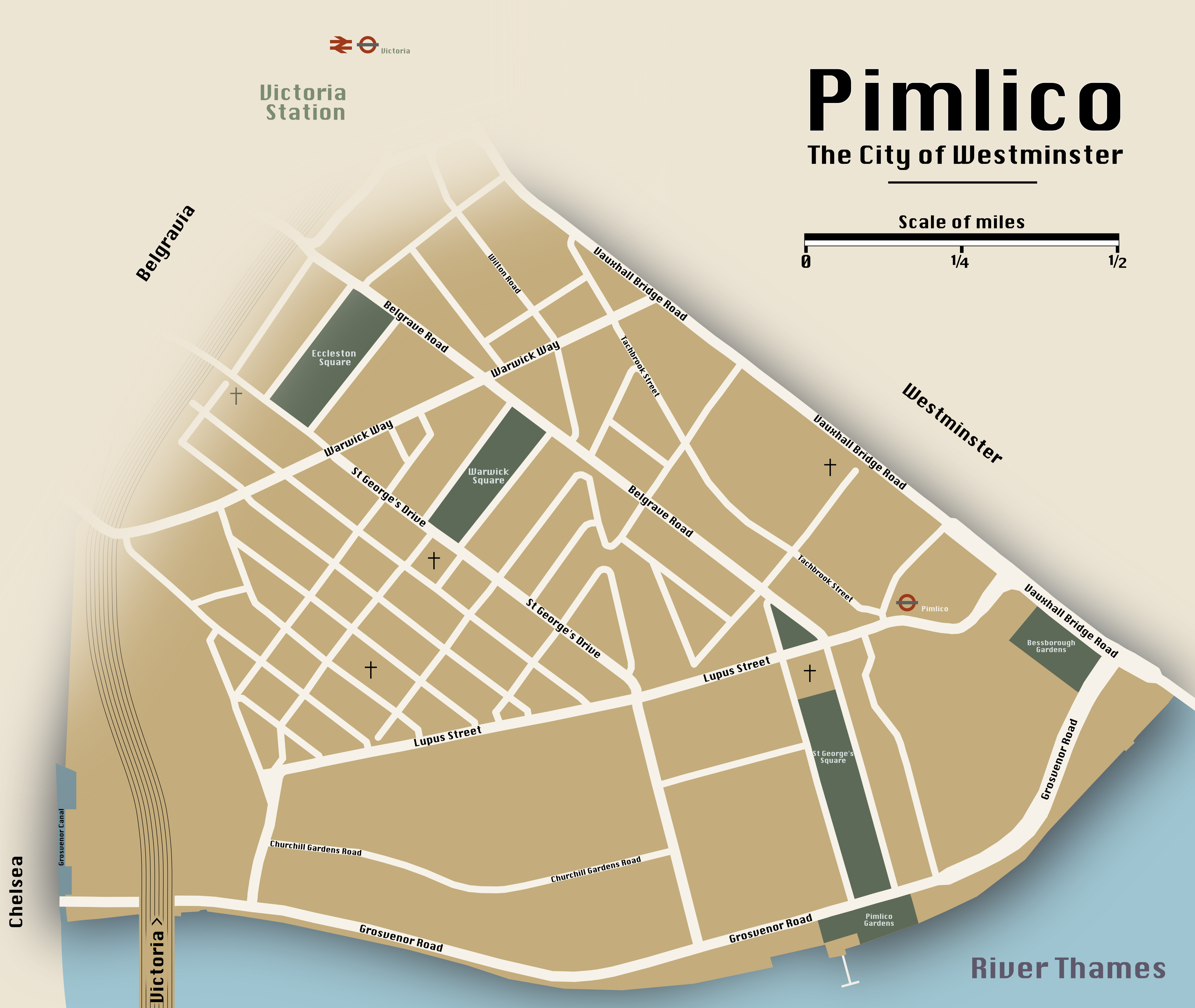
- Map of Pimlico

- Location within Greater London
- OS grid reference: TQ295785
- London borough: Westminster
- Ceremonial county: Greater London
- Region: London
- Country: England
- Sovereign state: United Kingdom
- Post town: London
- Postcode district: SW1V
- Dialling code: 020
- Police: Metropolitan
- Fire: London
- Ambulance: London
- UK Parliament: Cities of London and Westminster
- London Assembly: West Central

Pimlico (/ˈpɪmlɪkoʊ/) is a district in Central London, in the City of Westminster, built as a southern extension to neighbouring Belgravia.

It is known for its garden squares and distinctive Regency architecture. Pimlico is demarcated to the north by Victoria Station, by the River Thames to the south, Vauxhall Bridge Road to the east and the former Grosvenor Canal to the west. At its heart is a grid of residential streets laid down by the planner Thomas Cubitt, beginning in 1825 and now protected as the Pimlico Conservation Area. The most prestigious are those on the three garden squares: St George's Square, Warwick Square, Eccleston Square, and the wider avenues of Belgrave Road and St. George's Drive.

The area has over 350 Grade II–listed buildings and several Grade II* listed churches. At the western edge of Pimlico, on the borders of Chelsea, Pimlico Road has in recent years seen a loss of traditional local retail, replaced by upscale interiors and design stores.

Additions have included Dolphin Square, which is pre–Second World War, and the Churchill Gardens and Lillington and Longmoore Gardens estates which are post-War. (All, including Dolphin Square, are now conservation areas in their own right.)

== History ==
=== Early history and origin of name ===
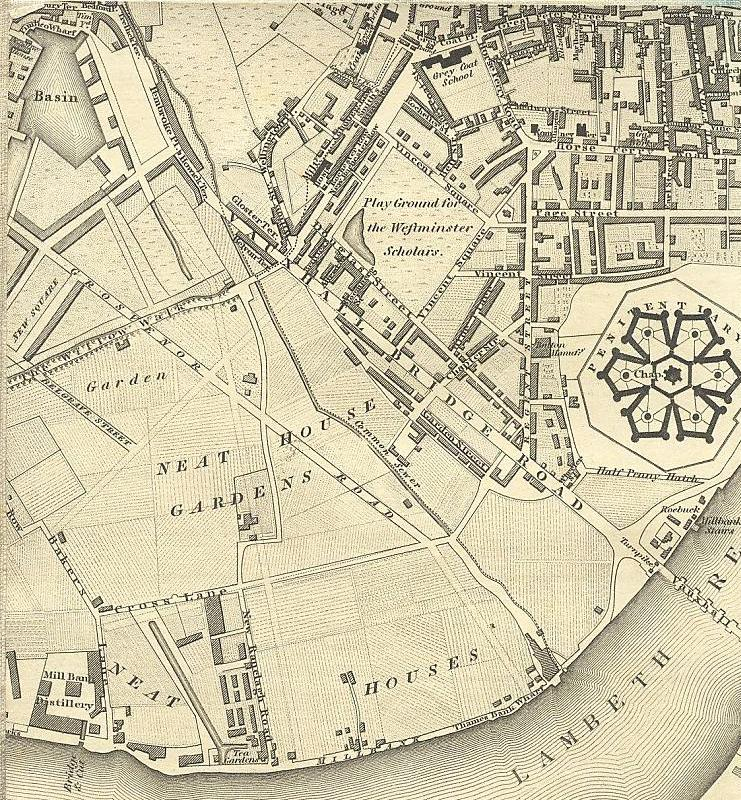
Greenwood's 1827 map showing parts of Pimlico and Millbank prior to development

In the sixteenth and seventeenth centuries, the Manor of Ebury was divided up and leased by the Crown to servants or favourites. In 1623, King James I sold the freehold of Ebury for £1,151 and 15 shillings. (Note: £1,151.75, about £197,000 in 2021, indexed by retail price inflation. Property price inflation has been considerably greater.) The land was sold several more times until it came into the hands of heiress Mary Davies in 1666.

Mary's dowry not only included "The Five Fields" of modern-day Pimlico and Belgravia, but also most of what is now Mayfair and Knightsbridge. Understandably, she was much pursued, but in 1677, at the age of twelve, she married Sir Thomas Grosvenor, 3rd Baronet. The Grosvenors were a family of Norman descent, long seated at Eaton Hall in Cheshire who, until this auspicious marriage, were of no more than local consequence in their native county. Through the development and good management of this land, the Grosvenors acquired enormous wealth.

At some point in the late seventeenth or early eighteenth century, the area ceased to be known as Ebury or "The Five Fields" and gained the name by which it is now known. While its origins are disputed, it is "clearly of foreign derivation ... [William] Gifford, in a note in his edition of Ben Jonson, tells us that 'Pimlico is sometimes spoken of as a person, and may not improbably have been the master of a house once famous for ale of a particular description'". Supporting this etymology, E. Cobham Brewer describes the area as "a district of public gardens much frequented on holidays. According to tradition, it received its name from Ben Pimlico, famous for his nut-brown ale. His tea-gardens, however, were near Hoxton, and the road to them was termed Pimlico Path, so that what is now called Pimlico was so named from the popularity of the Hoxton resort".

H. G. Wells, in his novel The Dream, says that there was a wharf at Pimlico where ships from America docked and that the word Pimlico came with the trade and was the last word left alive of the Algonquin Indian language (Pamlico).

=== Development ===
Belgravia and Pimlico in 1903

By the 19th century, and as a result of an increase in demand for property in the previously unfashionable West End of London following the Great Plague of London and the Great Fire of London, Pimlico had become ripe for development. In 1825, Thomas Cubitt was contracted by Lord Grosvenor to develop Pimlico. The land up to this time had been marshy but was reclaimed using soil excavated during the construction of St Katharine Docks.

Cubitt developed Pimlico as a grid of handsome white stucco terraces. The largest and most opulent houses were built along St George's Drive and Belgrave Road, the two principal streets, and Eccleston, Warwick and St George's Squares. Lupus Street contained similarly grand houses, as well as shops and, until the early twentieth century, a hospital for women and children. Smaller-scale properties, typically of three storeys, line the side streets.

An 1877 newspaper article described Pimlico as "genteel, sacred to professional men… not rich enough to luxuriate in Belgravia proper, but rich enough to live in private houses." Its inhabitants were "more lively than in Kensington... and yet a cut above Chelsea, which is only commercial."

Although the area was dominated by the well-to-do middle and upper-middle classes as late as Charles Booth's 1889 Map of London Poverty, parts of Pimlico are said to have declined significantly by the 1890s. When the Rev. Gerald Olivier moved to the neighbourhood in 1912 with his family, including the young Laurence Olivier, to minister to the parishioners of St Saviour, it was part of a venture to west London "slums" that had previously taken the family to the depths of Notting Hill.

Through the late nineteenth century, Pimlico saw the construction of several Peabody Estates, charitable housing associations designed to provide affordable, quality homes.

=== Twentieth-century ===
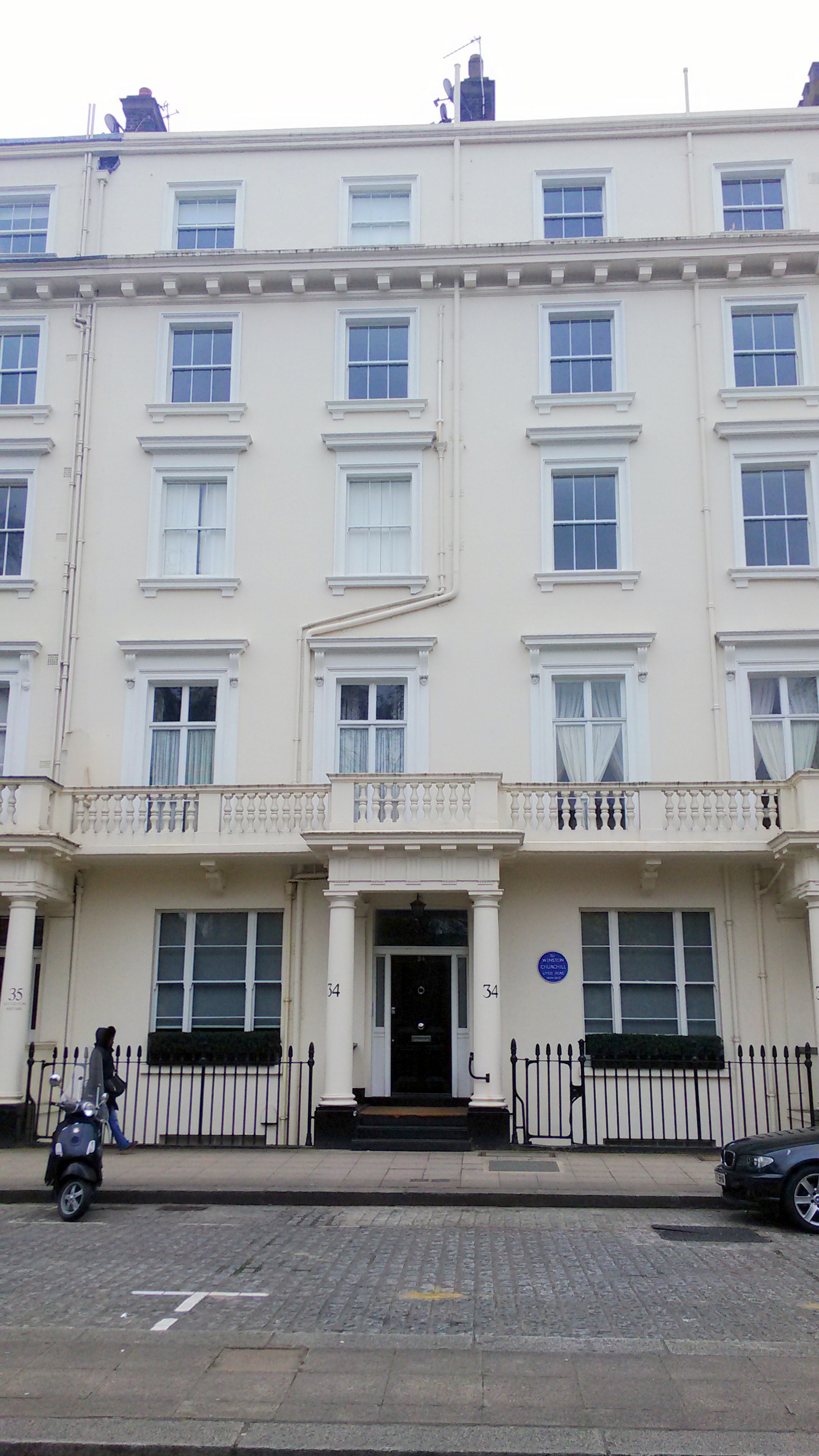
33 Eccleston Square; Labour and TUC headquarters offices during the 1920s

Proximity to the Houses of Parliament made Pimlico a centre of political activity. Prior to 1928, the Labour Party and Trades Union Congress shared offices at 33 Eccleston Square, and it was here in 1926 that the general strike was organised.

In the mid-1930s, Pimlico saw a second wave of development with the construction of Dolphin Square, a self-contained "city" of 1,250 up-market flats built on the site formerly occupied by Cubitt's building works. Completed in 1937, it quickly became popular with MPs and public servants. It was home to fascist Oswald Mosley until his arrest in 1940, and the headquarters of the Free French for much of the World War II.

Pimlico survived the war with its essential character intact, although parts sustained significant bomb damage. Through the 1950s, these areas were the focus of large-scale redevelopment as the Churchill Gardens and Lillington and Longmoore Gardens estates, and many of the larger Victorian houses were converted to hotels and other uses.

To provide affordable and efficient heating to the residents of the new post-war developments, Pimlico became one of the few places in the United Kingdom to have a district heating system installed. District heating became popular after World War II to heat the large residential estates that replaced areas devastated by the Blitz. The Pimlico District Heating Undertaking (PDHU) is just north of the River Thames. The PDHU first became operational in 1950 and continues to expand to this day. The PDHU once relied on waste heat from the now-disused Battersea Power Station on the south side of the River Thames. It is still in operation, the water now being heated locally by a new energy centre which incorporates 3.1 MWe /4.0 MWTh of gas-fired CHP engines and 3×8 MW gas-fired boilers.

In 1953, the Second Duke of Westminster sold the part of the Grosvenor estate on which Pimlico is built.

In 1970, whilst Roger Byron-Collins was a partner in Mullett Booker Estate Agents in Albion Street on the Hyde Park Estate, he sold the entire 27-acre freehold Pimlico Estate for £4.4 million to Jack Dellal of Dalton Barton Bank in a joint venture with Peter Crane of City and Municipal Properties, being a consortium controlled by the Hanson Trust. He was introduced to the owners of the Estate by the Hon Brian Alexander, son of Field Marshal Earl Alexander of Tunis, who at that time represented Previews International, a part of Coldwell Banker. Brian Alexander's friend, Colin Tennant, Lord Glenconner, owner of Mustique island in the Caribbean, was friends with Henry Cubitt, Lord Ashcombe, the chairman of the builders, Holland, Hannen and Cubitts, who developed the estate comprising 480 homes in the 19th century and were major shareholders in partnership with Harry Reynolds of Reynolds Engineering, of then owners CR Developments. Brian Alexander, after leaving Previews International, eventually became MD of the Mustique Company for many decades.

Pimlico was connected to the London Underground in 1972 as a late addition to the Victoria line. Following the designation of a conservation area in 1968 (extended in 1973 and again in 1990), the area has seen extensive regeneration. Successive waves of development have given Pimlico an interesting social mix, combining exclusive restaurants and residences with Westminster City Council-run facilities.

For a history of street name etymologies in the area see: Street names of Pimlico and Victoria

== Notable buildings ==
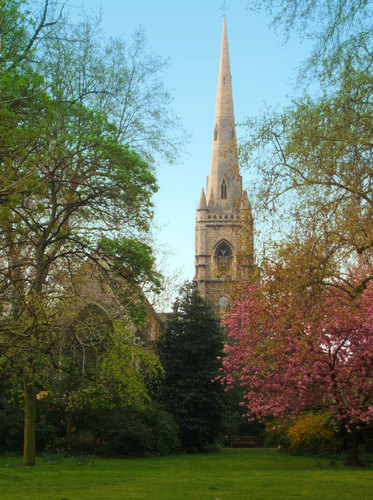
St Gabriel's Church in Warwick Square

Dolphin Square is a block of private apartments built between 1935 and 1937. At the time of their construction, the development was billed as the largest self-contained block of flats in Europe. It is home to many members of parliament (MPs).

On Buckingham Palace Road is the former "Empire Terminal" of Imperial Airways, a striking Art Moderne building designed in 1938 by architect Albert Lakeman. Mail, freight and passengers were transported from the terminal to Southampton via rail before transferring to flying boats. The building now serves as the headquarters of the National Audit Office.

Churchill Gardens is a housing estate covering the south-west corner of Pimlico. It was developed between 1946 and 1962 to a design by the architects Powell and Moya, replacing docks, industrial works, and several Cubitt terraces damaged in the Blitz.

The area contains a number of Anglican churches, most constructed at the time the neighbourhood was laid out. Among them are St Gabriel's (of which a former Vicar is now Archdeacon of Chichester), St Saviour and St James the Less. From its founding, St Peter's, Eaton Square, Belgravia, was usually recorded as St Peter's, Pimlico (at least prior to 1878). The area's Catholic church, Holy Apostles, was destroyed in the Blitz and rebuilt in 1957. The headquarters of the Catholic Bishops' Conference of England and Wales are located in Eccleston Square.

Tate Britain is located within the ward of Millbank, but is a short walk from Pimlico Underground station and is regarded as a Pimlico landmark. The district's association with fine art has been reinforced by the Chelsea College of Art and Design's recent move to the former Royal Army Medical College next to the Tate.

Pimlico School, a comprehensive school built between 1967 and 1970, was a notable example of Brutalist architecture. It was demolished in 2010.

== Notable residents ==
=== Blue plaques ===
- Aubrey Beardsley, illustrator – lived at 114 Cambridge Street
- Sir Winston Churchill, politician – lived at 33 Eccleston Square and Morpeth Terrace
- Joseph Conrad, Polish-born British novelist – lived at 17 Gillingham Street
- Sir Michael Costa, conductor and orchestra reformer – lived at 59 Eccleston Square
- William Morris "Billy" Hughes, 7th Prime Minister of Australia – born at 7 Moreton Place
- Jomo Kenyatta, first president of Kenya – lived at 95 Cambridge Street
- Douglas Macmillan, founder of Cancer Relief – lived at 15 Ranelagh Road
- Swami Vivekananda, Hindu philosopher – lived briefly at 63 St George's Drive
- Major Walter Clopton Wingfield, father of lawn tennis – lived at 33 St George's Square

=== Others ===
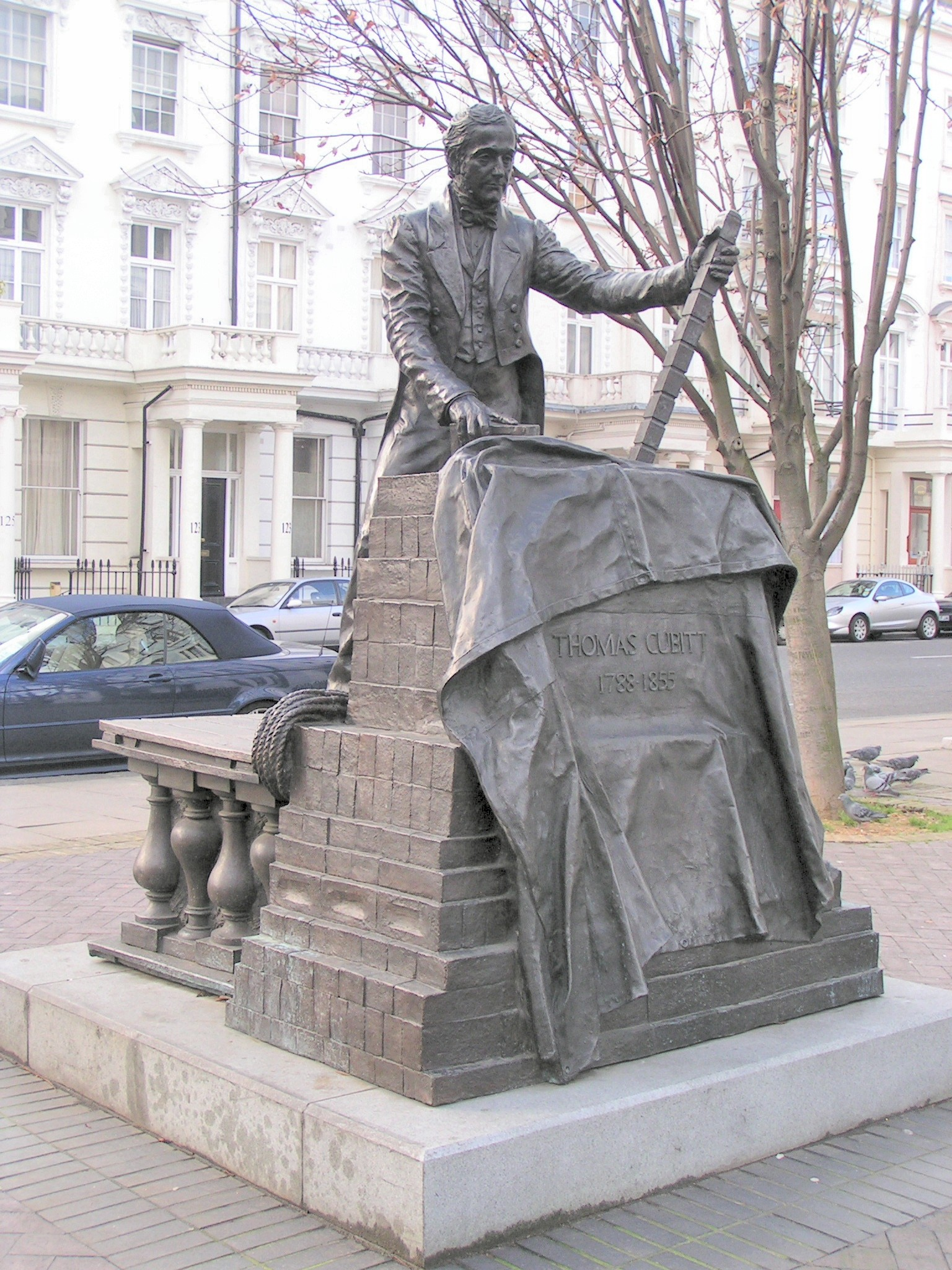
Statue of Thomas Cubitt by William Fawke in Denbigh Street

- David Heyman, Film producer
- Bill Nighy, actor
- Nickie Aiken, Conservative Former member of parliament (MP) for Cities of London and Westminster
- Laura Ashley, designer – 83 Cambridge Street
- Wilfrid Brambell, actor, star of Steptoe and Son – Denbigh Street
- Louisa Crow, Victorian novelist and poet
- James Crump, founder of St Aubyn's School, Woodford Green – 86 Cambridge Street
- Anthony Davis, comedian and broadcaster
- Charles De Gaulle, Free French leader and French president – Dolphin Square
- Douglas Douglas-Hamilton, 14th Duke of Hamilton, First man to fly over Mount Everest – born 71 Eccleston Square
- Isadora Duncan, American dancer – 33 Warwick Square
- Bertha Jane Grundy, novelist, died in Eccleston Square on 5 September 1912
- Steve Hackett, former Genesis guitarist
- William Hague, former British Foreign Secretary
- Basil Harwood, organist and composer
- Michael Howard, former Conservative Party leader
- Arthur Foord Hughes, artist
- Jeremy Hunt, politician
- Rhys Ifans, Welsh actor
- Luke Irvine-Capel, Archdeacon of Chichester, lived at 30 Warwick Square during his tenure as Vicar of St Gabriel's, Warwick Square (2008–2013).
- Catherine Johnson, creator of the musical Mamma Mia!
- James Lennox Kerr, Scottish socialist author
- Gavin MacFadyen (1940–2016), the director of WikiLeaks and founder of the Centre for Investigative Journalism (CIJ)
- Oswald Mosley, British Union of Fascists leader, and his wife Diana Guinness née Mitford – Dolphin Square
- Ian Nairn, architectural critic – 14 Warwick Square
- Laurence Olivier, actor – 22 Lupus Street
- Barbara Pym, writer – 108 Cambridge Street
- Sheila Scott, aviator
- Tony Selby (1938–2021), actor
- Pamela Colman Smith, nicknamed Pixie, artist, illustrator, and writer
- Bram Stoker, author of Dracula – died at 26 St George's Square
- Gianluca Vialli, Italian football striker and manager
- Lucy Bethia Walford, Scottish-born novelist, died on 11 May 1915 – 17 Warwick Square.
- Herbert William Weekes, genre and animal painter – born in Pimlico, c. 1842
- Henry Weekes, RA, Victorian era sculptor – worked at No. 2, lived at No. 96, Eccleston Street
- Paul Weller, singer/songwriter, lived in a flat in Pimlico in the early 1980s
- Small Faces, 1960s band – 22 Westmoreland Terrace

== Cultural references ==
Pimlico is the setting of the 1940 version of Gaslight, and the 1949 Ealing comedy Passport To Pimlico.

In the BBC adaptation of J.K. Rowling's (Robert Galbraith) novel, The Ink Black Heart, Eccleston Square Mews is featured as the location where the character Madeline lives.

Barbara Pym used St Gabriel's Church as her inspiration for St Mary's in Excellent Women.

The area is the home of Francis Urquhart in Michael Dobbs's 1989 novel, House of Cards.

While still only partially built, the area is the abode of a criminal gang in Charles Palliser's 1989 novel, The Quincunx. They live in 'carcasses', part-built houses on which work has ceased owing to the drying-up of funds, due in turn to an involved conspiracy central to the book's convoluted plot.

Alexander McCall Smith's on-line Daily Telegraph serial novel Corduroy Mansions is set in Pimlico.

== Transport ==
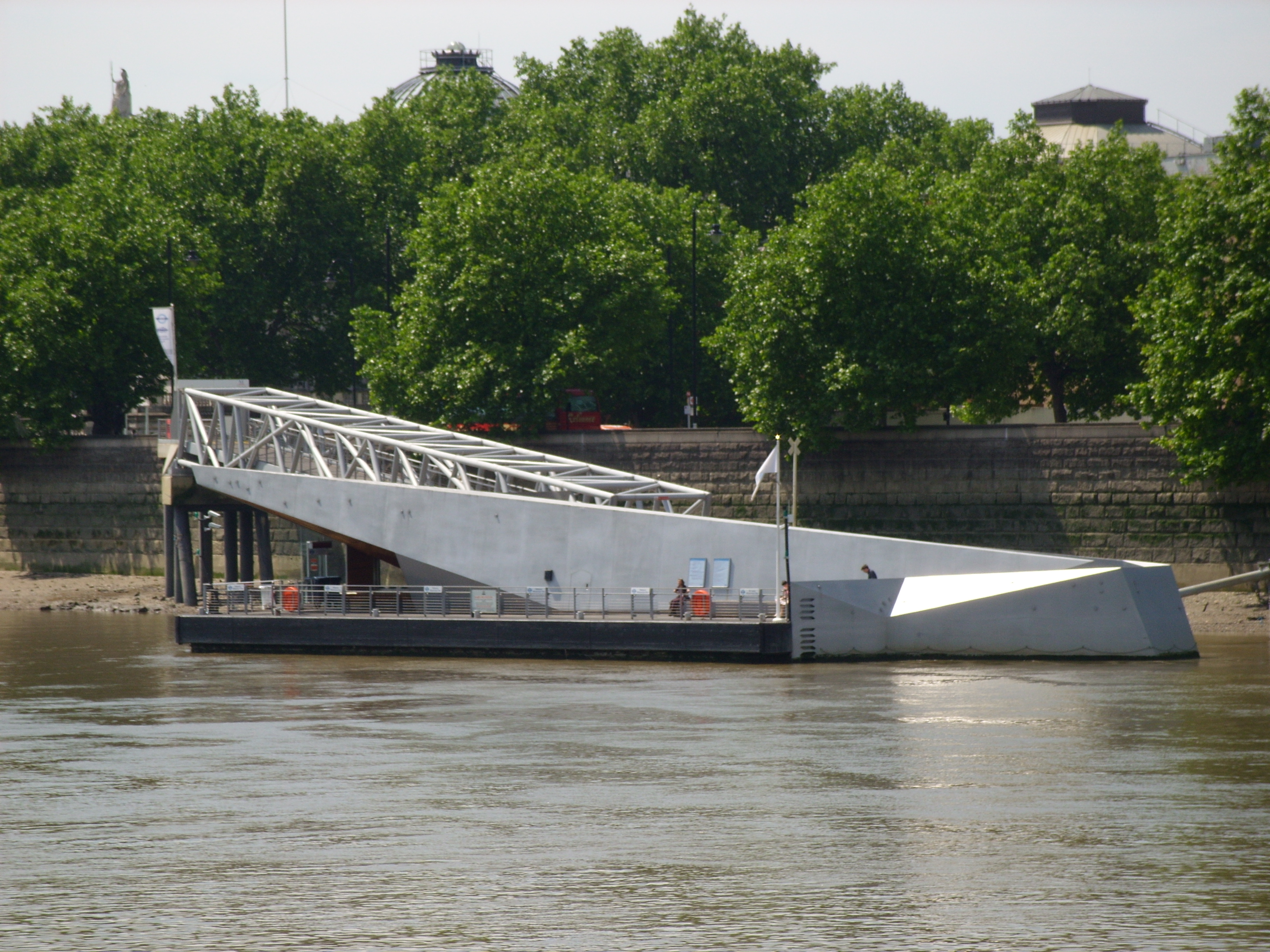
Riverboat services run from Millbank Millennium Pier

Pimlico is served by Pimlico station on the Victoria line and Victoria station on the Victoria, District and Circle lines. It is also served by National Rail services to London Victoria Station.

Bus routes that run centrally through Pimlico are the 24, 360 and the C10. Many more buses run along Vauxhall Bridge Road (Pimlico's eastern boundary). Riverboat services to Waterloo and Southwark run from Millbank Millennium Pier. The area has a dozen docking stations for the Santander Cycles scheme.

Pimlico would be connected at Victoria to the proposed Chelsea–Hackney line (Crossrail 2). Plans under consideration for the redevelopment of Nine Elms and Battersea Power Station include a pedestrian bridge stretching across the river from St George's Square; in 2015, Wandsworth council awarded Bystrup and partners the design for the £40m bridge, with spiral ramps preserving parks at both ends.

== Governance ==
The area is represented on Westminster City Council by the wards of Pimlico North and Pimlico South. These all form part of the Cities of London and Westminster parliamentary constituency, currently represented by MP Rachel Blake, Labour. Of the six local councillors, three are Labour and three are Conservative. Pimlico is part of the West Central constituency on the London Assembly, which is represented by James Small-Edwards AM.
