= Musophilus =

1599 poem by Samuel Daniel

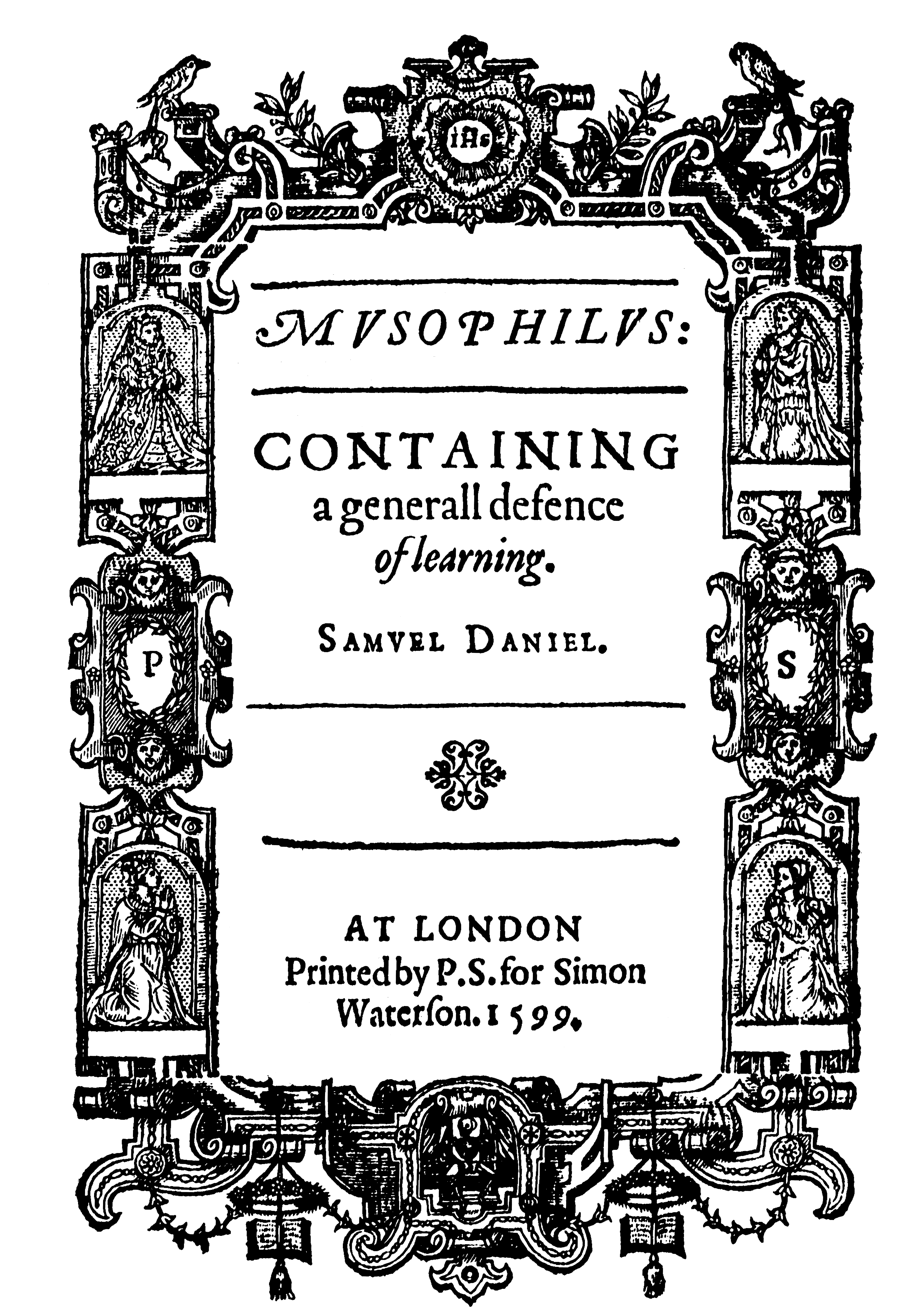
Title page from the Poeticall Essayes (1599)

Musophilus is a long poem by Samuel Daniel, first published in 1599 in his Poetical Essays.

Among Daniel's most characteristic works, it is a dialogue between a courtier and a man of letters, and is a general defence of learning, and in particular of poetic learning as an instrument in the education of the perfect courtier or man of action. It is addressed to Fulke Greville.

== Textual history ==
Daniel first published Musophilus in his Poeticall Essayes of 1599. The poem was published again in 1601/1602, largely unchanged except in accidentals such as punctuation, and in the deletion of the final three stanzas, reducing the poem from 1002 to 984 lines. However, the text published in 1607 witnessed not only frequent revisions affecting diction and rhythm, but also extensive cuts, deleting nearly 200 lines. A few further alterations were made for the 1611 edition, including a new dedicatory poem to Fulke Greville, replacing the dedicatory sonnet to him in all other editions. Modern editors tend to be critical of these revisions, referring to them as "mutilations" that "all but ruined" the poem, or, more diplomatically, "not always to the poem's advantage". The posthumous Whole Works of 1623 returned to the 1601 version as its basis.

All modern editions use either the 1599 text (Sprague; Hiller & Groves) or the 1623 text (Grosart; Himelick) as their copy-texts.

== Versification ==
The poem is introduced by a dedicatory Spenserian sonnet: 14 lines of iambic pentameter rhyming ABAB BCBC CDCD EE. (Note: These notes pertain to the text of the first edition of 1599. The texts of the 1601 and 1623 editions are identical in verse structure, except for the deletion of the final 3 (ABABAB) stanzas. The texts of 1607 and 1611 are significantly shorter. The edition of 1611 replaces the dedicatory sonnet with a 36-line iambic pentameter poem in 2 verse paragraphs: the first comprising 6 quatrains and 1 closing couplet; the second comprising 2 quatrains and 1 closing couplet. All quatrains rime ABAB except the 4th, which rimes ABBA.)

The poem proper is written entirely in iambic pentameter with rimes forming a variety of stanzas. 118 stanzas (over 2/3 of the poem) are 6-line stanzas riming ABABAB. Interspersed with these are 14 ottava rima stanzas riming ABABABCC, 4 Venus and Adonis stanzas riming ABABCC, and a single heroic quatrain riming ABAB. These rime schemes might be thought of as the first 4, first 6, last 6, and all 8 lines of an ottava rima stanza.

Finally, lines 727-880 (Note: In Hiller & Groves's numbering system; other editions number differently.) form an unbroken series of 51 tercets of terza rima (riming ABA BCB CDC...) with 1 final line to complete the central rime of the final tercet (...YZY Z). Even this quite different structure can be seen as corresponding with the other stanzas: if conceptualized as 6-line stanzas (as modern editions do), the resulting rime scheme ABABCB is only 1 rime removed from the main stanza of the poem, the interloping C providing the rime that links to the next stanza.

The relations of these rime schemes are tabulated below as Philocosmus (Musophilus's skeptical interlocutor) begins their dialogue by challenging him as to the practical value of poetry.

Musophilus, first stanza (ottava rima)	OR	SIX	TR×2	HQ	V&A
Fond man, Musophilus, that thus dost spend	A	A	A	A
In an ungainful art thy dearest days,	B	B	B	B
Tiring thy wits and toiling to no end	A	A	A	A	A
But to attain that idle smoke of praise,	B	B	B	B	B
Now, when this busy world cannot attend	A	A	C		A
Th' untimely music of neglected lays;	B	B	B		B
Other delights than these, other desires	C				C
This wiser profit-seeking age requires.	C				C

== Bibliography ==
=== Early editions ===
Listed are the four editions (with one reissue) published in Daniel's lifetime; plus the Whole Works of 1623, published posthumously by Daniel's publisher, close friend, and executor, Simon Waterson, with Daniel's brother John.

- Daniel, Samuel (1599). The Poeticall Essayes of Sam. Danyel. London: P. Short for Simon Waterson. OCLC 1136676109.
- ——————— (1602) [1601]. The VVorks of Samuel Daniel Newly Augmented. OCLC 1269301730.
- ——————— (1607). Certaine Small Workes Heretofore Divulged by Samuel Daniel one of the Groomes of the Queenes Maiesties priuie Chamber, & now againe by him corrected and augmented. London: I[ohn] W[indet] for Simon Waterson. OCLC 606547933.
- ——————— (1611). Certaine Small Workes Heretofore Divulged by Samuel Daniel one of the Groomes of the Queenes Maiesties most Honourable priuie Chamber, and now againe by him corrected and augmented. London: I[ohn] L[egat] for Simon Waterson. OCLC 216696681.
- ——————— (1623). The Whole Workes of Samuel Daniel Esquire in Poetrie. London: Nicholas Okes for Simon Waterson. OCLC 7020009.

=== Modern editions ===
- Daniel, Samuel (1885). Grosart, Alexander Balloch (ed.). The Complete Works in Verse and Prose of Samuel Daniel. Vol. 1. London: Hazell, Watson and Viney.
- ——————— (1930). Sprague, Arthur Colby (ed.). Poems and a Defence of Ryme. Cambridge, MA: Harvard University Press. OCLC 832812101.
- ——————— (1965). Himelick, Raymond (ed.). Samuel Daniel's Musophilus: Containing A General Defense of all Learning. West Lafayette, IN: Purdue University Studies. OCLC 725970351.
- ——————— (1998). Hiller, Geoffrey G.; Groves, Peter L. (eds.). Samuel Daniel: Selected Poetry and A Defense of Rhyme. Asheville, NC: Pegasus Press. ISBN 978-1889818047. OCLC 39116681.

=== Other references ===
- Pitcher, John (2017). "Samuel Daniel: New and Future Research". Oxford Handbooks Online. Oxford University Press. doi:10.1093/oxfordhb/9780199935338.013.88. ISBN 978-0-19-993533-8.
