= Somerset House =

Building on the Strand, London

Coordinates: 51°30′40″N 0°07′04″W

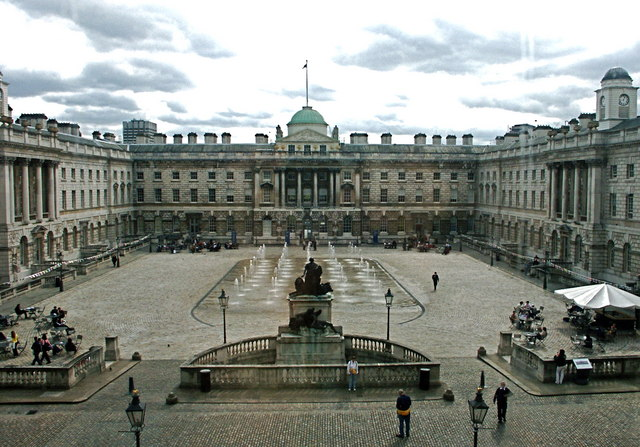
- Courtyard of Somerset House from the North Wing entrance (September 2007)

General information
- Architectural style: Renaissance
- Location: Strand; London, WC2, United Kingdom
- Current tenants: Multiple
- Construction started: 1776; 250 years ago
- Cost: £462,323 (1801)
- Landlord: Somerset House Trust

Design and construction
- Architect: Sir William Chambers
- Designations: Grade I listed building

Other information
- Public transit: Temple

Website
- www.somersethouse.org.uk

Listed Building – Grade I
- Official name: Somerset House and King's College Old Building
- Designated: 5 February 1970
- Reference no.: 1237041

Somerset House is a large neoclassical building complex situated on the south side of the Strand in central London, overlooking the River Thames, just east of Waterloo Bridge. The Georgian era quadrangle is built on the site of a Tudor palace ("Old Somerset House") originally belonging to Edward Seymour, 1st Duke of Somerset. The present Somerset House was designed by Sir William Chambers, begun in 1776, and was further extended with Victorian era outer wings to the east and west in 1831 and 1856 respectively. The site of Somerset House stood directly on the River Thames until the Victoria Embankment was built in the late 1860s.

The great Georgian era structure was built to be a grand public building housing various government and public-benefit society offices. Since the early 21st century, Somerset House has been redeveloped as a cultural centre. It is home to a community of arts organisations, creative businesses and artist studios, and hosts a year-round programme of exhibitions, performances, music, film and public events.

== Old Somerset House ==
=== 16th century ===
In the 16th century, the Strand, the north bank of the Thames between the City of London and the Palace of Westminster, was a favoured site for the mansions of bishops and aristocrats, who could commute from their own landing stages upriver to the court or downriver to the City and beyond. In 1539, Edward Seymour, 1st Earl of Hertford, obtained a grant of land at "Chester Place, outside Temple Bar, London" from his brother-in-law King Henry VIII. When his nephew the young Edward VI came to the throne in 1547, Seymour became Duke of Somerset and Lord Protector. In about 1549 he pulled down an old Inn of Chancery and other houses that stood on the site, and began to build himself a palatial residence, making liberal use of other nearby buildings, including some of the chantry chapels and cloisters at St Paul's Cathedral, which were demolished partly at his behest as part of the ongoing dissolution of the monasteries. It was a two-storey house built around a quadrangle, with a gateway rising to three storeys, and was one of the earliest examples of Renaissance architecture in England. It is not known who designed the building.

Before it was finished, however, the Duke of Somerset was overthrown, attainted by Parliament and in 1552 was executed on Tower Hill. Somerset Place, as the building was referred to, then came into the possession of the Crown. The duke's royal nephew's half-sister, the future Elizabeth I, lived there during the reign of her half-sister Mary I (1553–58). The process of completion and improvement was slow and costly. As late as 1598 John Stow refers to it as "yet unfinished".

=== 17th and 18th centuries ===
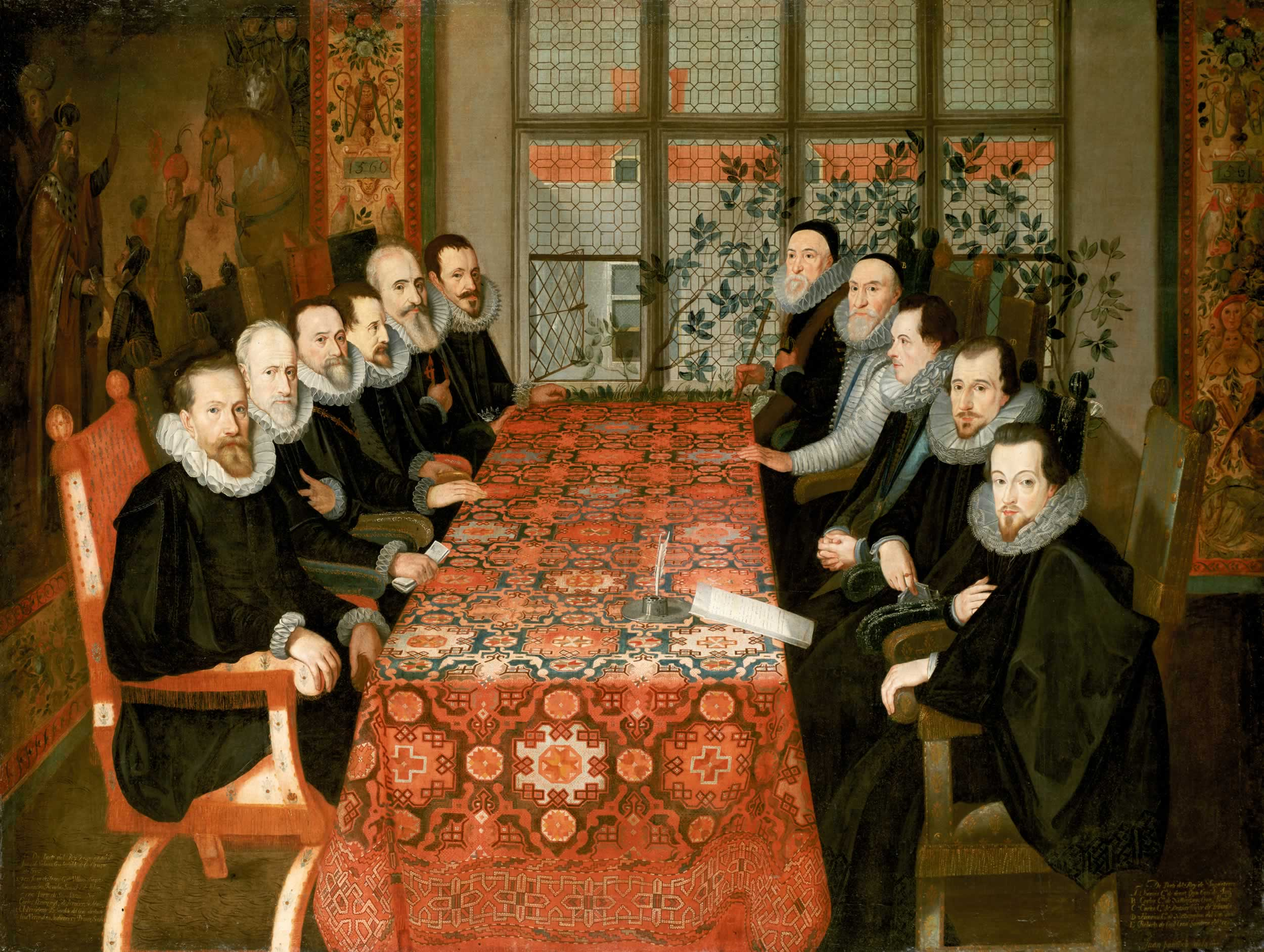
The Somerset House Conference, 19 August 1604

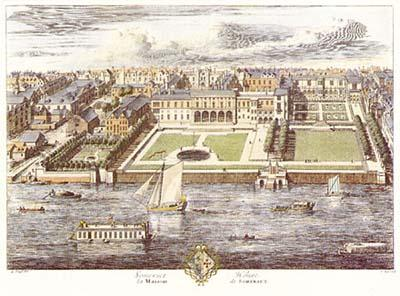
Old Somerset House, in a drawing by Jan Kip published in 1722, was a sprawling and irregular complex with wings from different periods in a mixture of styles. The buildings behind all four square gardens belong to Somerset House.

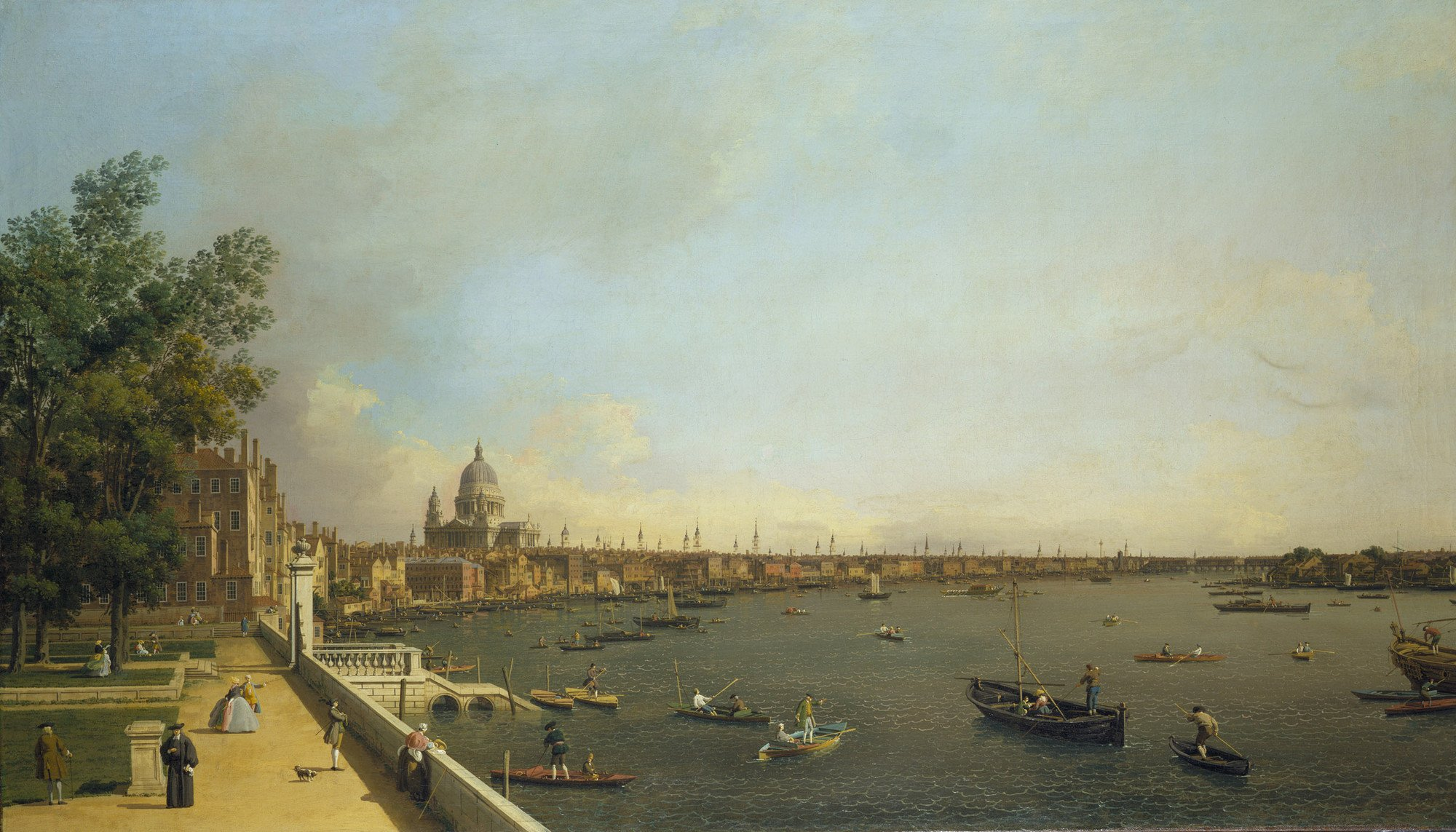
The Thames from the Terrace of Somerset House Looking Towards St. Paul's, c. 1750 by Canaletto

In the summer of 1604, Somerset House was the location for the negotiations, known as the Somerset House Conference that culminated in the Treaty of London and concluded the nineteen-year Anglo-Spanish War. The treaty was signed on 28 August (New Style), at Whitehall Palace, by the Constable of Castile who was lodged at Somerset House. The conference was the subject of an oil-on-canvas painting depicting the 11 representatives of the governments of England, Spain and the Spanish Netherlands, seated around a conference table, probably in Old Somerset House.

During the 17th century, the house was used as a residence by royal consorts. In the reign of James I, the building was the London residence of his wife, Anne of Denmark, and was renamed Denmark House. She commissioned a number of expensive additions and improvements, some to designs by Inigo Jones. In 1609, Simon Basil and William Goodrowse made steps and terraces in the garden. Anne of Denmark built an orangery and employed a French gardener and hydraulic engineer Salomon de Caus. He built a fountain named after Mount Parnassus with a grotto carved with sea-shells and a black marble female figure representing the River Thames. The fountain was topped by a statue of Pegasus. A surviving cistern for the fountain in nearby Strand Lane was misidentified as a Roman bath.

The refurbished palace was the setting for elaborate entertainments at the wedding of Anne's lady in waiting Jean Drummond on 3 February 1614, including a masque Hymen's Triumph written by Samuel Daniel. On 22 May 1614, Christian IV of Denmark paid a surprise visit to his sister. In 1619, King James granted the palace to Prince Charles. Frances Coke, Viscountess Purbeck was appointed keeper of Denmark House, and Mary Villiers, Countess of Buckingham frequently stayed there.

After the death of King James in April 1625, his body was brought from Theobalds to lie in state at Denmark House. The state rooms were hung with black cloth. At this period there was no chapel at Denmark House, and so the Great Hall was adapted, and the body moved there before the funeral at Westminster Abbey.

Between 1630 and 1635 Inigo Jones built a chapel where Henrietta Maria of France, the wife of Charles I, could exercise her Roman Catholic religion. This was in the care of the Capuchin Order and was on a site to the southwest of the Great Court. A small cemetery was attached and some of the tombstones are still to be seen built into one of the walls of a passage under the present quadrangle.

Royal occupation of Somerset House was interrupted by the Civil War, and in 1649 Parliament tried to sell it. They failed to find a buyer, although a sale of the contents (most notably 1,570 paintings owned by Charles I) realised the very considerable sum of £118,000 (equivalent to £17,510,842 in 2025). Use was still found for it however. Part of it served as an army headquarters, with General Thomas Fairfax (the Parliamentarians' commander-in-chief) being given official quarters there; lodgings were also provided for certain other Parliamentarian notables. It was in Somerset House that Lord Protector Oliver Cromwell's body lay in state after his death in 1658.

Two years later, with the Restoration, Queen Henrietta Maria returned and in 1661 began a considerable programme of rebuilding, the main feature of which was a magnificent new river front, again to the design of the late Inigo Jones, who had died at Somerset House in 1652. However she returned to France in 1665 before it was finished. It was then used as an occasional residence by Catherine of Braganza, wife of Charles II. During her time it received a certain notoriety as being, in the popular mind, a hot-bed of Catholic conspiracy. Titus Oates made full use of this prejudice in the fabricated details of the Popish Plot and it was alleged that Sir Edmund Berry Godfrey, whose murder was one of the great mysteries of the age, had been killed in Somerset House before his body had been smuggled out and thrown into a ditch below Primrose Hill.

Somerset House was refurbished by Sir Christopher Wren in 1685. In 1686, the office of the Master of the Revels was in Somerset House. After the Glorious Revolution in 1688, Somerset House entered on a long period of decline, being used (after Queen Catherine left England in 1692) for grace and favour residences. In the conditions of the time this meant almost inevitably that little money could be found for its upkeep, and a slow process of decay crept in. During the 18th century, however, the building ceased its royal associations. Though the view from its terraced riverfront garden, open to the public, was painted twice on his London visit by Canaletto (looking up- and downriver), it was used for storage, as a residence for visiting overseas dignitaries and as a barracks for troops. Suffering from neglect, Old Somerset House began to be demolished in 1775.

== Somerset House (Sir William Chambers, 1776) ==
Crown Lands Act 1775
- Act of Parliament
- Parliament of Great Britain
- Long title: An Act for settling Buckingham House, with the Appurtenances, upon the Queen, in case She shall survive His Majesty, in lieu of His Majesty's Palace of Somerset House; for enabling the Lords, Commissioners of His Majesty's Treasury to sell and dispose of Ely House in Holborn, and for applying the Money to arise by Sale thereof, together with other Monies, in erecting and establishing Publick Offices in Somerset House; and for embanking certain Parts of the River Thames, lying within the Bounds of the Manor of The Savoy, and for other Purposes therein mentioned.
- Citation: 15 Geo. 3. c. 33
- Territorial extent: Great Britain

Dates
- Royal assent: 26 May 1775
- Commencement: 29 November 1774 (Note: Start of session.)
Other legislation
Amends	Provision for the Queen Act 1761

Status: Current legislation

Text of statute as originally enacted

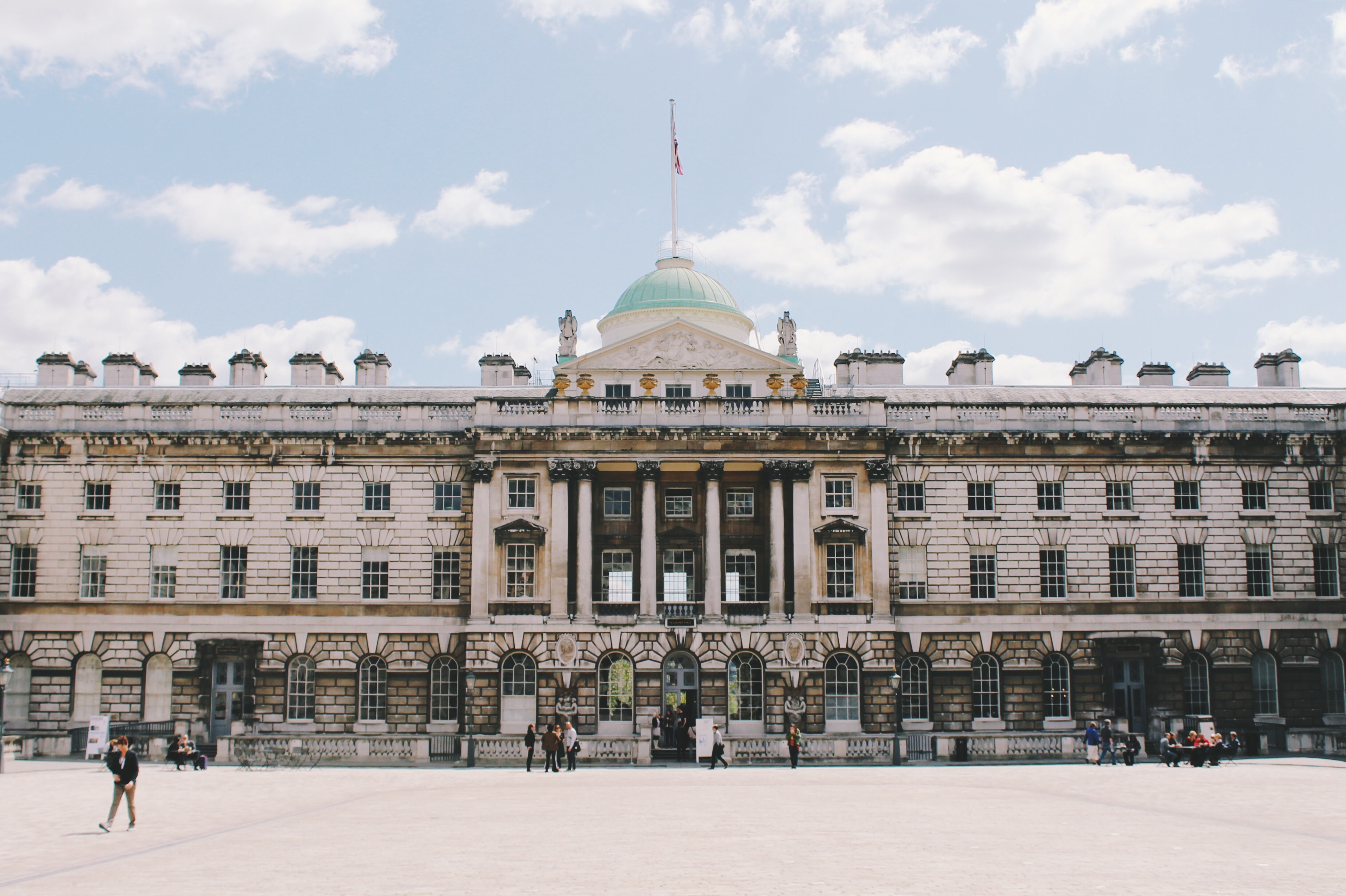
The south wing of Chambers' Somerset House

Since the middle of the 18th century there had been growing criticism that London had no great public buildings. Government departments and the learned societies were huddled away in small old buildings all over the city. Developing national pride found comparison with the capitals of continental Europe disquieting. Edmund Burke was the top proponent of the scheme for a "national building", and in 1775 Parliament passed an act, the Crown Lands Act 1775 (15 Geo. 3. c. 33), for the purpose of, inter alia, "erecting and establishing Publick Offices in Somerset House, and for embanking Parts of the River Thames lying within the bounds of the Manor of Savoy". The list of public offices mentioned in the act comprised "The Salt Office, The Stamp Office, The Tax Office, The Navy Office, The Navy Victualling Office, The Publick Lottery Office, The Hawkers and Pedlar Office, The Hackney Coach Office, The Surveyor General of the Crown Lands Office, The Auditors of the Imprest Office, The Pipe Office, The Office of the Duchy of Lancaster, The Office of the Duchy of Cornwall, The Office of Ordnance, The King's Bargemaster's House, The King's Bargehouses".

Somerset House was still technically a royal palace and therefore Crown property, with most work being done by the King's Master Mason, John Deval. The building had been placed in trust for the use of Queen Charlotte in the event that her husband George III predeceased her. Therefore, the 1775 act annulled this arrangement and instead provided for another property, Buckingham House, to be vested in trust for the Queen on the same terms. (Provision was made for the King, who had privately purchased Buckingham House some years earlier, to be duly compensated.) In due course, the King outlived the Queen and the property (later known as Buckingham Palace) reverted "to the use of His Majesty, his heirs and successors". By virtue of the same act, Ely House in Holborn (which had itself been purchased just a few years earlier as a potential site for new public offices) was sold and the proceeds applied to the Somerset House project.

Initially a certain William Robinson, Secretary to the Board of Works, was commissioned to design and build the new Somerset House, but he died in 1775 shortly after being appointed. So Sir William Chambers, Comptroller of the King's Works, (who had in any case been vying for the commission) was appointed in his stead, at a salary of £2,000 per year. He spent the last two decades of his life, beginning in 1775, in several phases of building at the present Somerset House. Thomas Telford, then a stonemason, but later an eminent civil engineer, was among those who worked on its construction. One of Chambers's most famous pupils, Thomas Hardwick Jnr, helped build parts of the building during his period of training and later wrote a short biography of Chambers. The design influenced other great buildings: Charles Bulfinch's Massachusetts State House, begun in 1795, has been described as a work "frankly derivative" of Somerset House.

=== Design ===
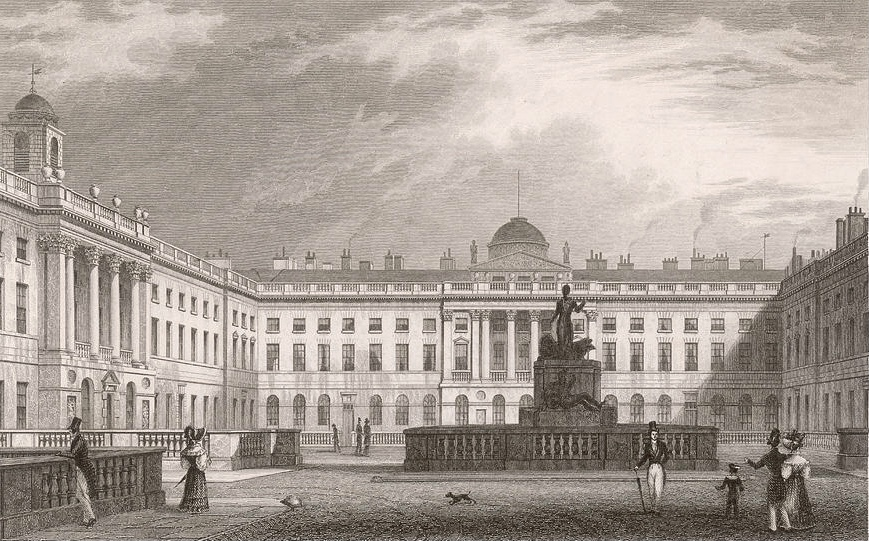
Somerset House in 1828

Chambers' own influences stemmed from Palladianism, the principles of which were applied throughout Somerset House, inside and outside, both in its large-scale conception and in its small-scale details. The footprint of the building was that of the old palace, ranging from its gateway block in the Strand across what was originally a gently sloping site down to the river. Chambers experimented with at least four different configurations of buildings and courtyards in drawing up his designs; his final version provided a single courtyard, 300 ft (91 m) by 200 ft (61 m), flanked by a pair of terraces, the whole presenting a unified frontage to the river, 500 feet (150 m) wide. Around the courtyard, each block consisted of six storeys: cellar, basement, ground, principal, attic and garret. The public offices and learned societies which were accommodated around the courtyard varied greatly in size, but each occupied all six floors of its allotted area, the upper floors often providing living space for a secretary or other official. Large vaults for storing public documents were provided, extending under the entire northern section of the courtyard.

==== Construction ====
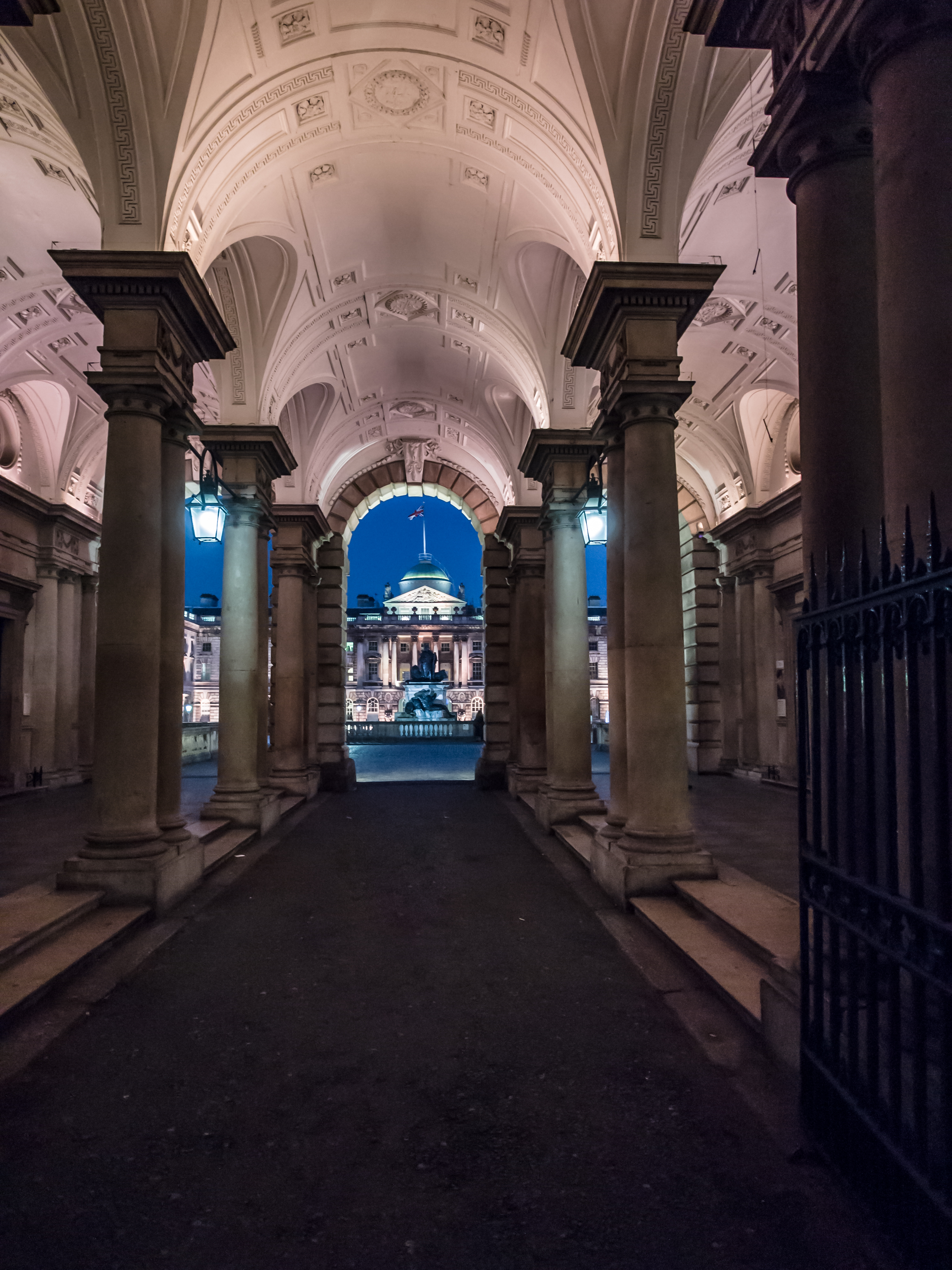
Night view from beneath the Strand entrance

The North Wing, fronting the Strand, was the first part of the complex to be built; its design was based on Inigo Jones's drawings for the riverfront of the former palace. By 1780 the North Wing was finished and occupied, and Chambers reported to Parliament that the rest of the quadrangle was complete up to a height of two storeys. Construction of the riverside wing followed; it was finished in 1786. At the time of construction, the Thames was not embanked and the river lapped the South Wing, where a great arch allowed boats and barges to penetrate to landing places within the building. Meanwhile, work continued on the East and West Wings, which began to be occupied from 1788; by 1790 the main quadrangle was complete.

It was originally envisaged that the main quadrangle would be flanked by two terraces of houses, one to the east and one to the west, providing accommodation for several of the Commissioners whose offices were based there. It is not certain at what pace the rest of the construction progressed, but it is clear that the outbreak of war with France in 1793 caused delays through lack of money. Chambers died in 1796, whereupon James Wyatt took over as architect. In the end, only the western terrace was built and by 1801 the building was deemed to be complete, at a cost of £462,323.

In 1815 Sir Robert Smirke was appointed as Attached Architect to Somerset House; in 1817 he added the Legacy Duty Office to the north-west corner of the quadrangle, its design in keeping with Chambers's adjacent façade. Even as late as 1819, decorative work to the exterior of the North Wing was still being completed.

==== Ornamentation ====
In addition to applying a rich scheme of architectural decoration, Chambers enhanced the exterior of Somerset House with a multiplicity of sculptures and other visual embellishments. Giovanni Cipriani produced designs and the sculptors executing them included Joseph Wilton, Agostino Carlini, John Bacon, Joseph Nollekens, John Cheere and Giuseppe Ceracchi. Bacon oversaw production of the bronze group of statues (consisting of Neptune and George III) in the main courtyard, facing the main entrance from the Strand.

Inside, most of the offices were simple and business-like, but in the North Wing the formal rooms and public spaces of the learned societies were enriched with painted ceilings (by Cipriani, Benjamin West, Angelica Kauffman, J. F. Rigaud, Charles Catton and Joshua Reynolds), ornamental plasterwork (by Thomas Collins and Thomas Clerk) and casts of classical sculptures. John Papworth did the plasterwork in the great Royal Academy Room; many of the ceiling paintings were removed by the Royal Academy when they vacated their premises.

=== Accommodation ===
A key reason for rebuilding Somerset House was to provide accommodation for a diverse variety of learned societies, public offices and naval administrators.

==== A home for arts and learning ====
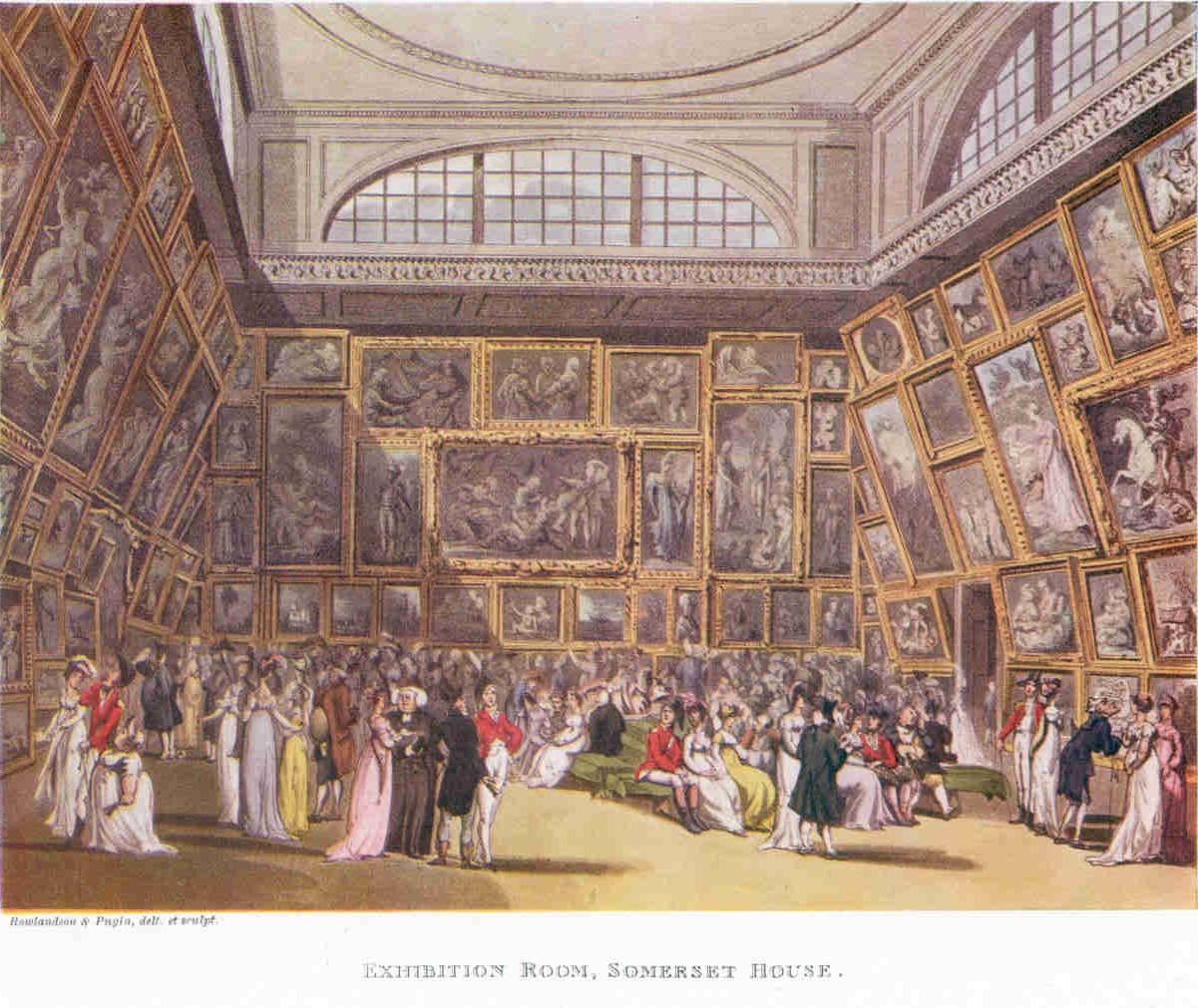
The Exhibition Room at Somerset House by Thomas Rowlandson and Augustus Charles Pugin (1800). This room is now part of the Courtauld Gallery.

The North Wing of Somerset House was initially fitted out to house the Royal Academy, the Royal Society and the Society of Antiquaries. The Royal Academy took up residence first, in 1779, followed by the other two institutions the following year. The Royal Academy occupied the western half of the wing and the Royal Society the eastern half; their main entrances faced each other across the central vestibule leading from the Strand to the courtyard, topped by busts (of Michelangelo and Isaac Newton respectively) which are still in place today. The Society of Antiquaries was also accommodated in the eastern half of the wing, though its premises were limited to a first-floor meeting room, a ground-floor library, an apartment in the attic and a kitchen in the basement.

The Geological Society was also accommodated in the Somerset House from 1828, as was the Royal Astronomical Society from 1834.

The annual Royal Academy Summer Exhibition was held in Somerset House from 1780 onwards, until the academy moved out in 1837 (initially to rooms in the new National Gallery, then to Burlington House, Piccadilly). Its former accommodation was given over to a newly established Government School of Design (which was much later to become the Royal College of Art); it remained in the complex from 1837 until, in 1853, the Registry of Births, Marriages and Deaths needed to expand its office space. The School relocated to Marlborough House, leading to intense public backlash.

In 1857, the Royal Society moved out of Somerset House, followed in 1874 by the Society of Antiquaries, the Geological Society and the Royal Astronomical Society; they were all provided with new purpose-built accommodation in Burlington House.

==== The Navy Office ====
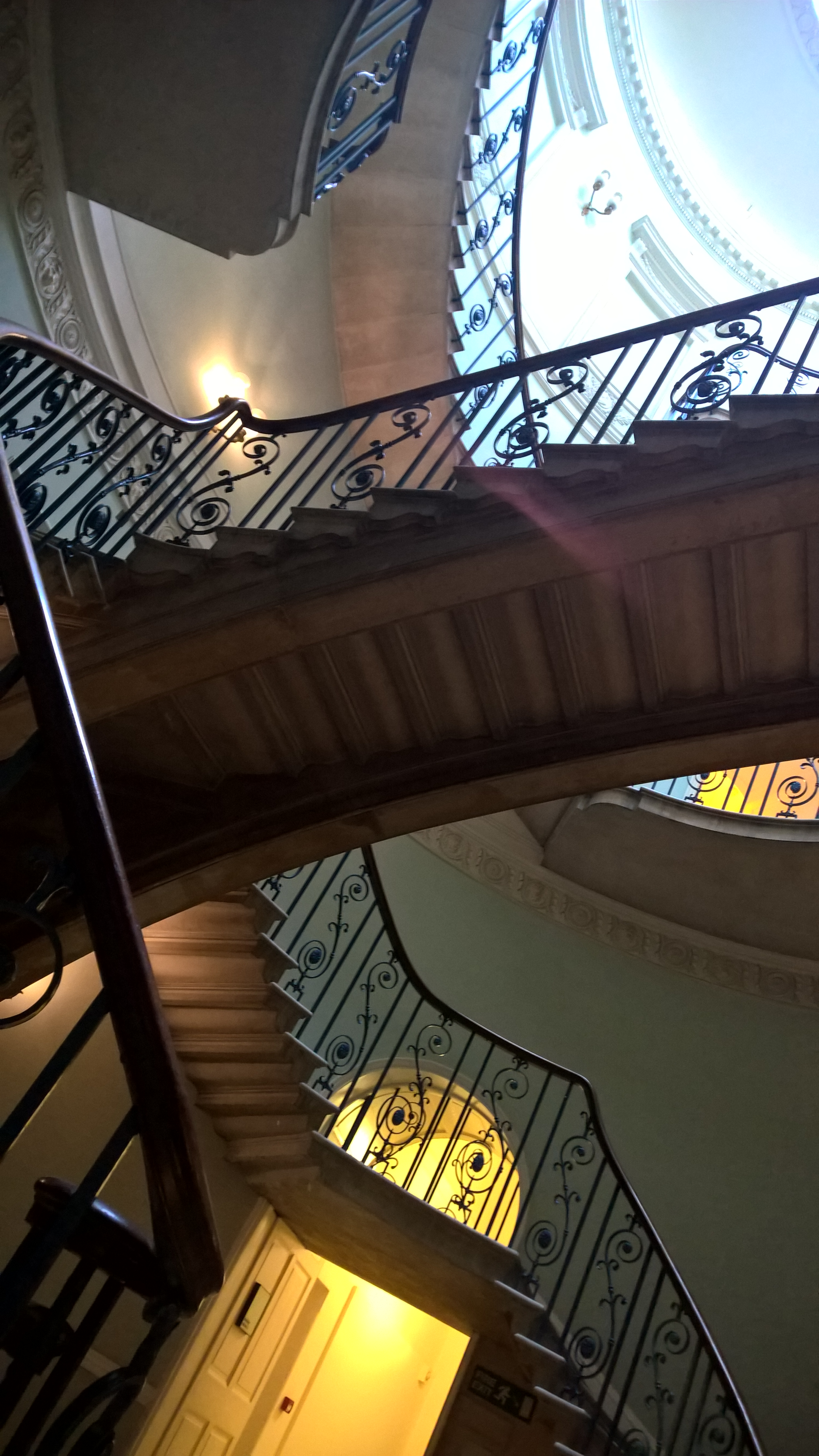
The Navy Stair (later renamed the 'Nelson Stair') which leads to the old Navy Boardroom.

In 1789 the Navy Board moved into grand riverside rooms in the western half of the newly completed South Wing. It was soon followed by its subsidiary Boards, the Victualling Commissioners and the Sick and Hurt Commissioners, which (along with the autonomous Navy Pay Office) occupied the West Wing; they had all hitherto been based in the City of London. Thus the various Navy offices occupied around a third of Chambers' completed building. In addition, the terrace to the west of the quadrangle provided dwelling-houses for the Comptroller of the Navy, the Secretary to the Board and three Commissioners of the Navy, along with the chairman, Secretary and two Commissioners of Victualling, with the Treasurer of the Navy allotted the 'mansion' at the river end of the terrace (which included a coach house and stables for ten horses in the vaults under the terrace). As well as providing office space and accommodation, Somerset House was the place where examinations for promotion to the rank of lieutenant took place, sat by several hundred midshipmen each year. The Admiralty Museum (a precursor to the National Maritime Museum) was also accommodated there, in the central room above the south portico.

In 1832 the Navy Board and its subsidiaries were abolished and their departments placed under the direct oversight of the Admiralty. Their administrative staff remained in Somerset House, but communications with the Admiralty (based a mile away in Whitehall) were problematic as what became known as the "civil departments" of the Admiralty guarded their independence. In 1868, the Admiralty took the decision to move all their staff from Somerset House to Whitehall; this necessitated reconfiguring what had been a set of residences there pertaining to the Lords Commissioners of the Admiralty into office accommodation. Nevertheless, the move was completed by 1873, and the expanding Inland Revenue immediately took over the vacated space in Somerset House.

==== Taxes, stamps and the Inland Revenue ====
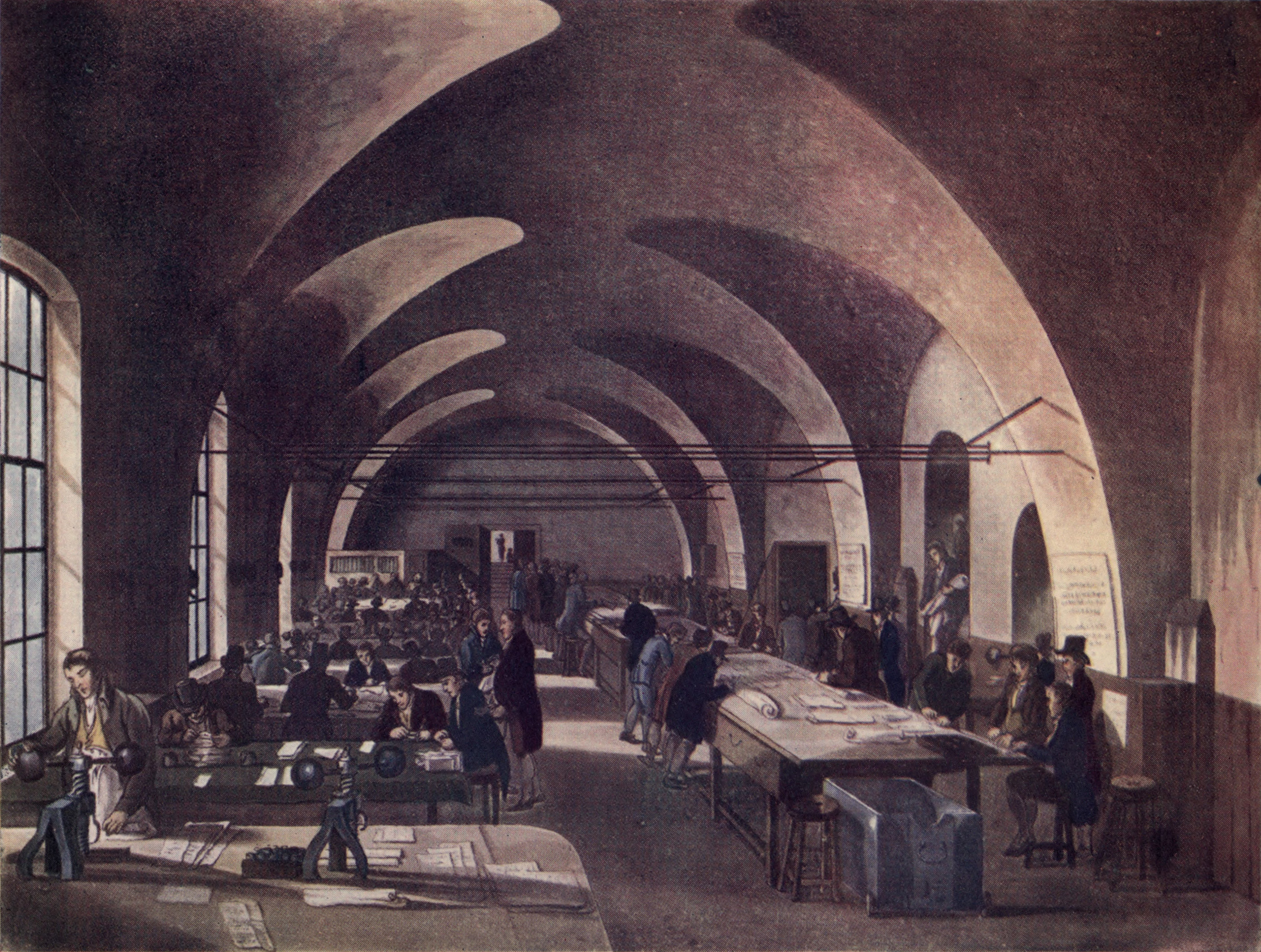
The Stamp Office, Somerset House: the basement stamping room.

From the beginning of the new Somerset House there was a fiscal presence in the shape of the Stamp Office and the Tax Office, the former occupying the eastern part of the South Wing from 1789 and the latter occupying part of the East Wing. The Stamp Office had the task of applying an impressed duty stamp to various specific items to show that the required duty had been paid. For example, up until 1855 (when the relevant duty was abolished) every newspaper produced in the country had to be brought to Somerset House to be stamped. The Tax Office administered and collected various taxes, including income tax (first levied in 1799). Introduced as a means of raising revenue in wartime, it was collected during the French Revolutionary Wars and the Napoleonic Wars; though repealed in 1816, it was reintroduced in peacetime (in 1842) and has been collected ever since.

The Inland Revenue was created by a merger of the Stamp and Taxes Office and the Excise Office in 1849; in 1854 the Excise Office staff were moved from their old headquarters in the City of London into the newly built New Wing.

Somerset House continued in use by the Inland Revenue throughout the 20th century. In 2005, the Inland Revenue was merged with HM Customs and Excise; its successor HM Revenue & Customs continued to occupy much of the building, although its executive and senior management moved to 100 Parliament Street shortly after the merger. Various divisions and directorates of HMRC continued to occupy the East Wing until 2009, the West Wing until 2011 and the New Wing until March 2013, by which time all staff had been relocated (with most moving across the street to the southwest wing of Bush House). This brought to an end a 224-year association of the revenue services with Somerset House.

==== Somerset House Laboratory ====
In 1842, the Excise Office had established a laboratory within its Broad Street headquarters for the prevention of the adulteration of tobacco products. It had started as basically a one-man operation by an employee of the Excise, George Phillips. After the Excise Office had been merged with the Office of Stamps and Taxes to form the Inland Revenue, the latter took over the laboratory; by 1858 it was reestablished in Somerset House as the Inland Revenue Laboratory (with Phillips remaining in charge). It was also known as the Somerset House Laboratory. Under the Inland Revenue, the Laboratory's work expanded to encompass the testing of many different substances, including food, beer and spirits, as well as tobacco.

Phillips retired as principal chemist in 1874. James Bell was then the principal chemist of Somerset House Laboratory until his retirement in 1894. He was replaced as principal chemist by Sir Thomas Edward Thorpe. At the same time, the laboratory was amalgamated with a similar facility that had been established within HM Customs and it was renamed the Government Laboratory. In 1897, Thorpe moved the Government Laboratory from Somerset House to a new building of his own design.

==== Registry of Births, Marriages and Deaths ====
In 1837, following the establishment of civil registration in the United Kingdom, the Registrar General of Births, Marriages and Deaths set up his office in the North Wing of Somerset House, establishing a connection that lasted for over 130 years. This office held all birth, marriage and death certificates in England and Wales until 1970, when the Registry and its associated archives were moved to nearby St Catherine's House at Aldwych.

From 1859 until 1998, the Principal Registry of the Court of Probate (latterly the Principal Probate Registry of the Family Division) was based in Somerset House, prior to its move to First Avenue House, High Holborn.

==== Other public offices ====
In addition to the learned societies, the ground floor rooms of the North Wing housed the Hawkers and Pedlars Office (on the west side) and the Hackney Coach Office, the Lottery Office, the Privy Seal and Signet Offices (on the east side). The Hackney Coach commissioners had been established on a permanent footing in 1694, while the Board of Commissioners of Hawkers, Pedlars and Petty Chapmen dated from 1698; the latter was abolished in 1810 and its work taken over by the Hackney Coach Office until its abolition in 1831, whereupon responsibility for licensing both of hackney carriages and of travelling traders passed to the Stamp Office. The Lottery Office, established in 1779, was also abolished in 1831 and its residual business likewise passed to the Stamp Office. The Signet Office was abolished in 1851 and the Privy Seal Office in 1884.

One of the first occupants of the building had been the Duchy of Cornwall Office. It was accommodated in the East Wing along with the Tax Office and various Exchequer offices (including the Pipe Office, the Lord Treasurer's Remembrancer's Office and the Office of the Clerk of the Estreats). As early as 1795 the Exchequer was requesting that more space be made available; Sir John Soane was engaged to redesign their offices, and as part of the scheme the Duchy was relocated to another part of the East Wing, prompting complaints from its officers. Pipe rolls and other ancient records of the Treasury and Exchequer (which had been moved to Somerset House from the Palace of Westminster in 1793) remained stored in the basements until the establishment of the Public Record Office in 1838.

The office of Lord Treasurer's Remembrancer ceased to exist in 1833 and the Pipe Office was abolished in 1834; however space in Somerset House continued to be at a premium: in 1854 an act of Parliament, the Duchy of Cornwall Office Act 1854 (17 & 18 Vict. c. 93), was passed, noting that the Duchy's rooms in Somerset House were now needed "for the use of the Commissioners of Inland Revenue, whose present office is insufficient for the Business thereof, and adjoins the said Office of the Duchy of Cornwall". The act provided for the Duchy Office to move to new, purpose-built premises in Pimlico: now known as 10 Buckingham Gate, the building still serves as head office for the Duchy.

From 1785 the Commissioners for Auditing Public Accounts were also housed in the East Wing, as was the Duchy of Lancaster Office (having moved there from accommodation in Gray's Inn) until it moved in 1823 to new offices across the road in Lancaster Place. The Surveyor of Crown Lands also had his office here until the early 19th century. The Salt Office initially occupied rooms in the West Wing, alongside the naval offices, but it was abolished in 1798 (administration of the salt tax having been transferred to the Board of Excise).

During the 19th century the North Wing contained, in addition, the offices of the Poor Law Commissioners (1834–47) and the Tithe Commissioners (1836–51), who also acted as the Copyhold Commissioners.

=== 19th-century expansion ===
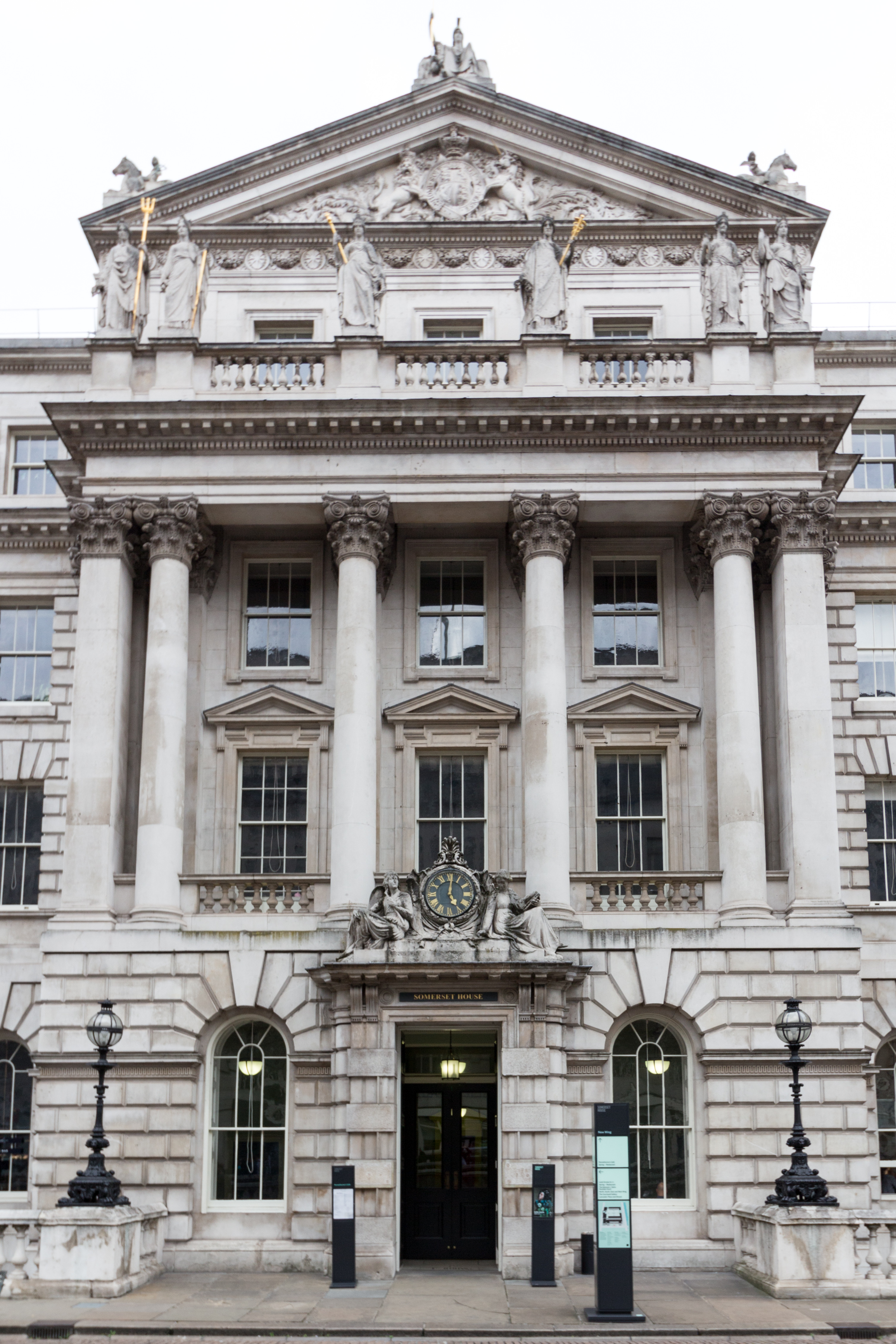
Part of the New Wing (main entrance facing Lancaster Place), built in the 1850s.

Magnificent as the new building was, it was something short of what Chambers had intended, for he had planned for an additional terrace of houses to the east, as well as to the west of the quadrangle; work had stopped short, however, cost being the inhibiting factor. Eventually King's College London was erected to the east (the government granting the land on condition that the design conformed to Chambers' original design) by subscription between 1829 and 1834; the architect was Sir Robert Smirke. At the same time, as part of Smirke's scheme, the eastern third of the river frontage was completed, following Chambers's original design.

Then, increasing demand for space led to another and last step. The western edge of the site was occupied by a row of houses used as dwellings for Admiralty officials who worked in the South Wing. Between 1851 and 1856, this terrace was substantially expanded and remodelled to provide the Inland Revenue with an entire new wing of additional office accommodation. As part of this development, its architect James Pennethorne created a monumental new façade alongside the approach road to Waterloo Bridge (which had not been in existence when Chambers was alive). 150 years later this part of the building is still known as the "New Wing".

In 1891 a headquarters building was constructed in the West Court (between the West Wing and the New Wing) for the Civil Service Rifles, a Rifle Volunteer Corps.

=== 20th-century modifications ===
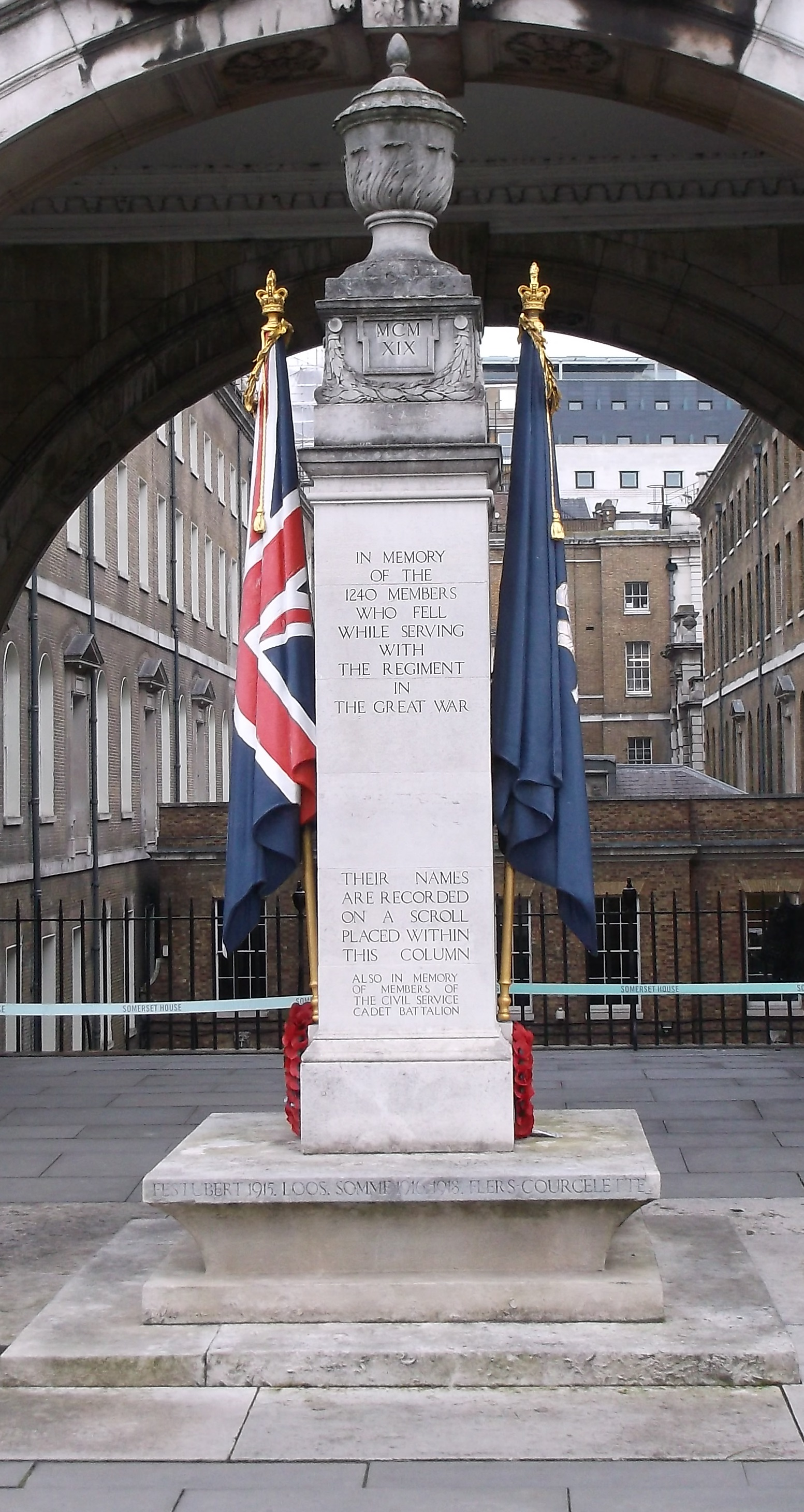
Civil Service Rifles War Memorial: installed in the main courtyard in 1919, relocated to the Terrace in 2002

By the start of the First World War the Civil Service Rifles, by then renamed the 15th (Prince of Wales' Own Civil Service Rifles) Battalion, The London Regiment, had its own Morris tube firing range (where the calibre of the rifle is reduced for indoor operation by a use of a tube) fitted with vanishing and running targets at Somerset House.

Somerset House had its share of trials and tribulations during the London blitz in the Second World War. Apart from comparatively minor blast effects at various times, sixteen rooms and the handsome rotunda staircase (the Nelson Stair) were completely destroyed in the South Wing, and a further 27 damaged in the West Wing by a direct hit in October 1940.

Still more windows were shattered and balustrades toppled, but the worst was over by the end of May 1941. It was not until the 1950s that this damage to the South Wing was repaired. The work required skilled masons, whose services were hard to come by in the early post-war years. Sir Albert Richardson was appointed architect for the reconstruction. He skillfully recreated the Nelson Room and rebuilt the Nelson Stair. The work was completed in 1952 at a cost of (then) £84,000.

Somerset House Act 1984
- Act of Parliament
- Parliament of the United Kingdom
- Long title: An Act to confer leasing powers on the Crown in respect of the Fine Rooms and other parts of Somerset House with a view to their use for artistic, cultural or other purposes.
- Citation: 1984 c. 21
- Territorial extent: United Kingdom

Dates
- Royal assent: 26 June 1984
- Commencement: 26 June 1984 (Note: Section 4(b) of the Interpretation Act 1978.)

Status: Current legislation

Text of statute as originally enacted

Revised text of statute as amended

Text of the Somerset House Act 1984 as in force today (including any amendments) within the United Kingdom, from legislation.gov.uk.

In 1984 the Somerset House Act 1984 (c. 21), an act of the Parliament of the United Kingdom, was passed, legislating the way for Somerset House to be redeveloped as a centre for the arts.

In 1997 the Somerset House Trust was established as a registered charity to maintain the building and develop it as a centre for arts.

In the late 20th century the building began to be reinvigorated as a centre for the visual arts. The first institution to move in (in 1989) was the Courtauld Institute of Art, including the Courtauld Gallery, which has an important collection of old master and impressionist paintings. The Courtauld occupies the North Wing.

=== 21st-century redevelopment ===
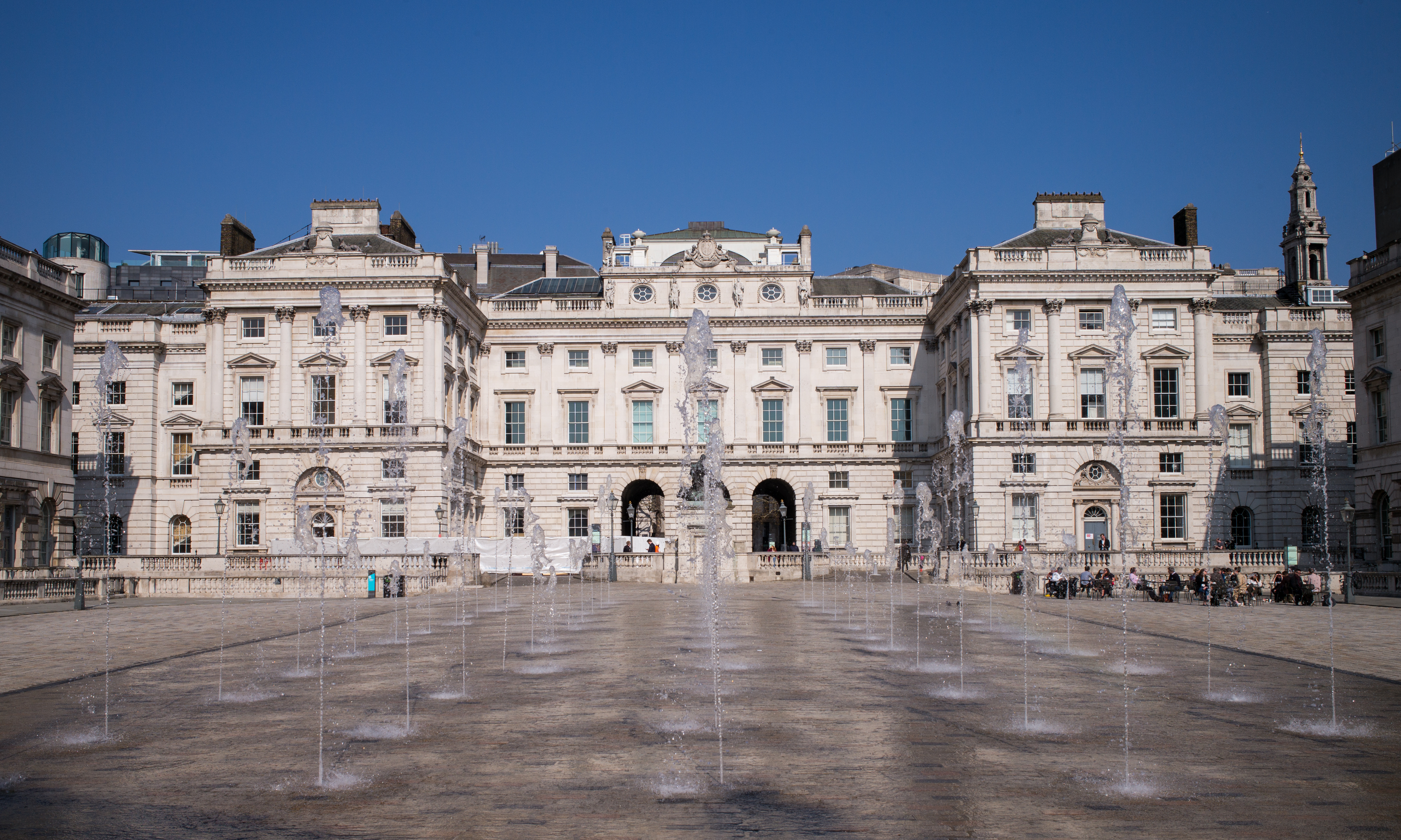
The dancing fountains were installed in the 1990s.

The main courtyard, which had been used as a Civil Service car park, and the main terrace overlooking the Thames were refurbished and opened to the public, these alterations being overseen by the conservation architects Donald Insall & Associates. Grants from the Heritage Lottery Fund financed the conversion of the South Wing between 1999 and 2003: a visitor centre featuring audio-visual displays on the history of the building, the gilded state barge of the Lord Mayor of the City of London and a shop and café were opened, overlooking the river. The Gilbert Collection of decorative arts, and the Hermitage Rooms, which staged exhibitions of items loaned from the Hermitage Museum in Saint Petersburg, moved into the same area. The last Hermitage exhibition took place in 2007 and the Gilbert Collection galleries closed in 2008; the collection moved into new galleries at the Victoria and Albert Museum in June 2009. Somerset House now puts on a programme of art exhibitions, drawing on various sources.

In stages from 2009 to 2013, HM Revenue and Customs withdrew from the other parts of the building; since March 2013 the Somerset House Trust has had oversight of the entire complex. Its management policy has been to rent out the upper floors at a commercial rate to "creative businesses", while devoting the ground floor to "public realm" activities. The trust receives no public subsidy and relies on income from rent and private hire to fund the upkeep of the estate and relies on ticket sales, merchandising and sponsorship to fund its artistic and cultural programme.

In 2014, Jonathan Reekie was appointed director of Somerset House Trust. Under the directorship of Jonathan Reekie, Somerset House Studios was launched in 2016 in the New Wing as a scheme of affordable studios, residencies and commissions for artists, designers, musicians and filmmakers working across disciplines, occupying 36,000 square feet of redeveloped space in the New Wing for more than 100 artists and makers. The programme was established in response to the declining availability of affordable artist workspace in London. The Somerset House Studios programme has since hosted notable resident artists including Christian Marclay, Gareth Pugh, Katie Paterson, Jasleen Kaur, Charles Jeffrey and Tai Shani.

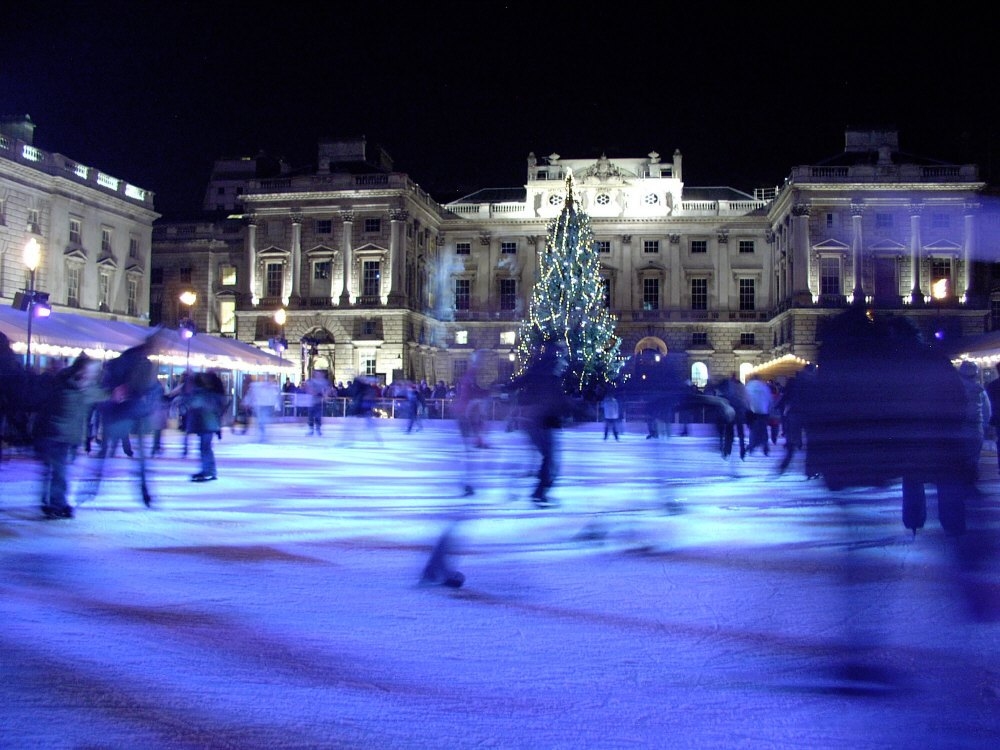
The ice-skating rink at Somerset House during Christmas 2004.

In the winter the central courtyard is home to a popular open-air ice rink, as seen during the opening credits of the 2003 Christmas-themed film Love Actually. At other times, 55 vertical jets of water rise to random heights from an array of fountains.

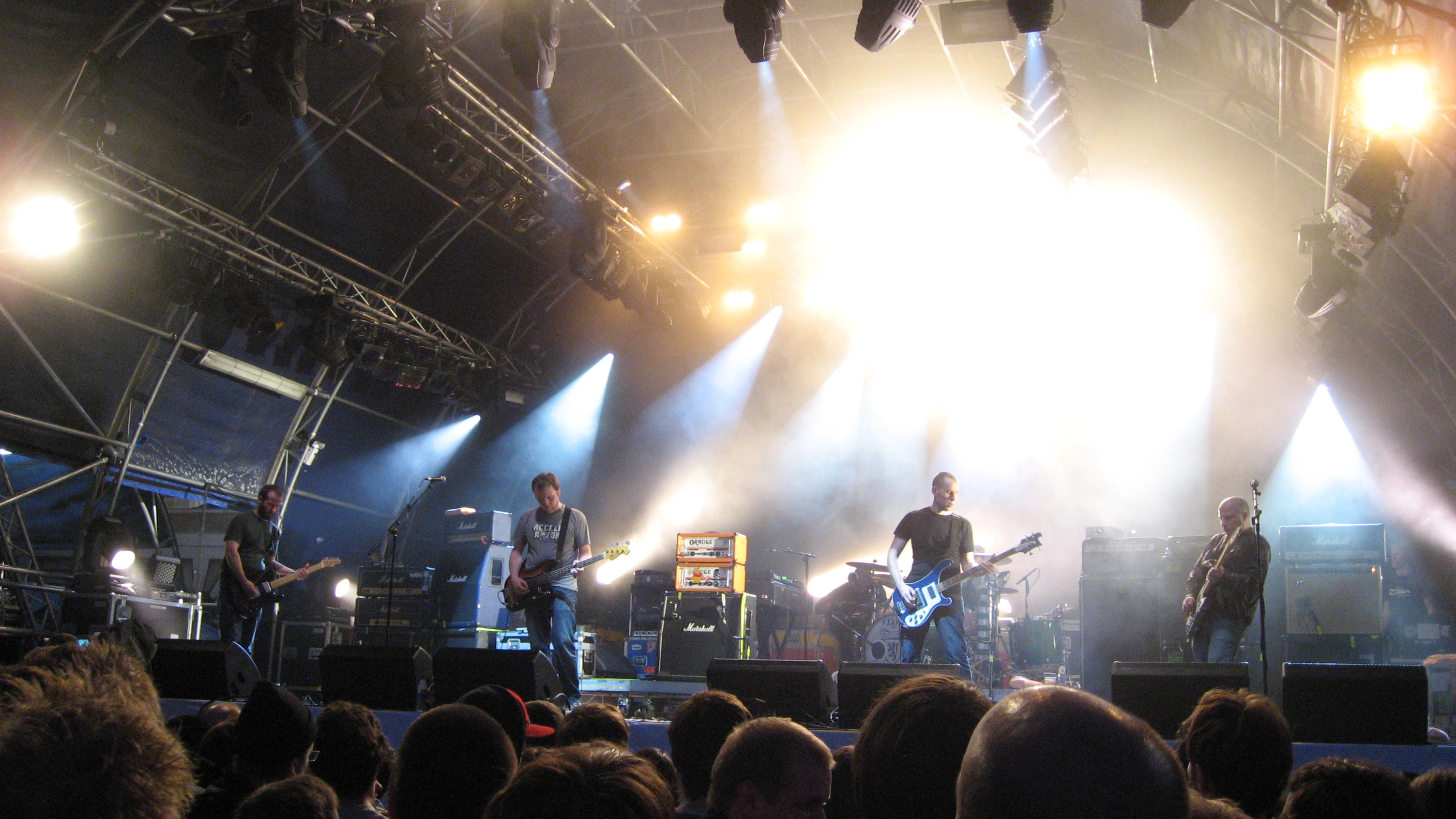
The post-rock band Mogwai playing live at Somerset House.

The courtyard is also used as a concert venue. In July each year the "Summer series" of music events takes place, which has included performances from artists such as Lily Allen.

Somerset House now has more than a hundred tenants, comprising a large and diverse collection of creative organisations and artists including Dance Umbrella, 7Wonder, Hofesh Shechter Company and the Royal Society of Literature. The largest tenant is King's College London, whose Cultural Institute, Executive Centre and Dickson Poon School of Law occupy the East Wing, which is adjacent to its historic College Building of 1831.

==== Filming location ====
Somerset House is a popular filming location, with its exterior featuring in several big-budget Hollywood films. These include two James Bond films, GoldenEye (1995) and Tomorrow Never Dies (1997). Several scenes of the 2003 film Shanghai Knights, starring Jackie Chan and Owen Wilson, were filmed in the courtyard of Somerset House. The courtyard was also used in the 1991 comedy King Ralph. Elements of the 2008 film The Duchess, starring Keira Knightley and Ralph Fiennes, were filmed in October 2007. Somerset House was also used as a filming location in several Sherlock Holmes films, including The Private Life of Sherlock Holmes (1970), directed by Billy Wilder, and Sherlock Holmes (2009), starring Jude Law and Robert Downey Jr., directed by Guy Ritchie. Somerset House was used as the external filming location for Olivia Newton-John's Stranger's Touch video, which featured as part of her Olivia Physical video album in 1981.

Exterior shots of Somerset House were used in the 1999 Tim Burton horror film Sleepy Hollow, starring Johnny Depp, and the 2006 film Flyboys. Somerset House was a filming location in the 2012 Bollywood film Jab Tak Hai Jaan, which starred Shah Rukh Khan, Katrina Kaif and Anushka Sharma, directed by Yash Chopra. Somerset House Courtyard was also used in the 2008 movie Last Chance Harvey, with Dustin Hoffman and Emma Thompson. Scenes were filmed in Somerset House for the Olympus Has Fallen sequel, London Has Fallen (2016). Exterior shots of Somerset House stood in for Himmler's HQ in Berlin in the 1976 film The Eagle Has Landed. The tunnels under Somerset House have also been used in the Harry Potter films, specifically some of scenes depicting 'Diagon Alley'.

Somerset House was also the main location for the BBC's New Year Live television show, presented by Natasha Kaplinsky, which celebrated the arrival of the year 2006.

==== Fire ====
On 17 August 2024, the London Fire Brigade responded to a large fire at the location which originated at the building's roof. The building's management said that the fire occurred in the structure's west wing, which did not contain artworks and was instead home to offices and related facilities.

== Gallery ==
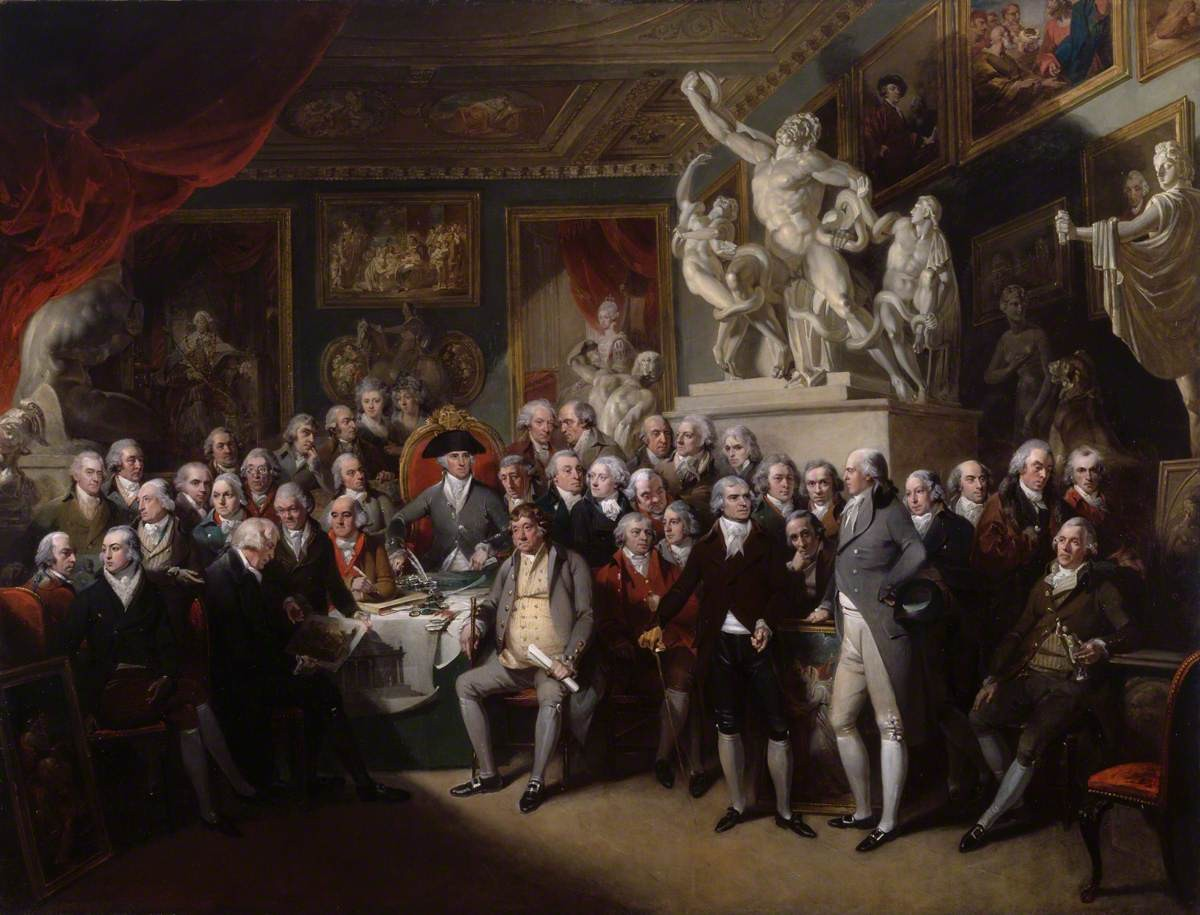
The Royal Academicians in General Assembly by Henry Singleton, 1795, when Somerset House hosted the Royal Academy

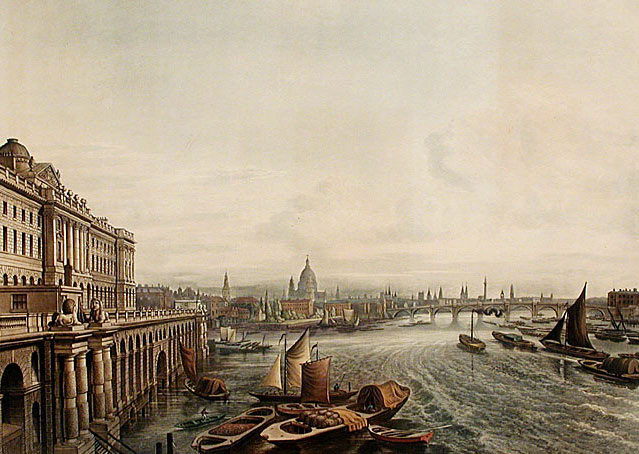
Somerset House in 1817, showing how the Thames originally flowed directly past the building, before the construction of the Victoria Embankment

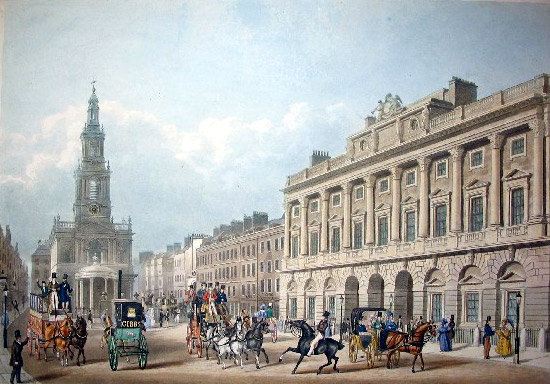
The Strand façade of Chambers' Somerset House and the church of St Mary-le-Strand, shown in a view of 1836

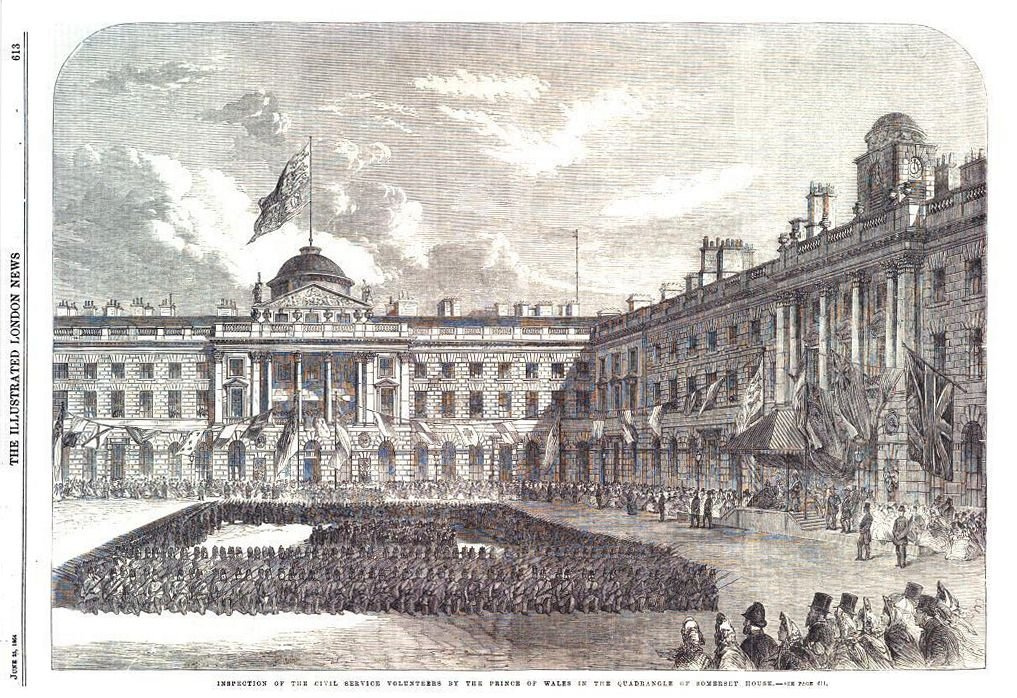
Courtyard view of the South and West wings in 1864.

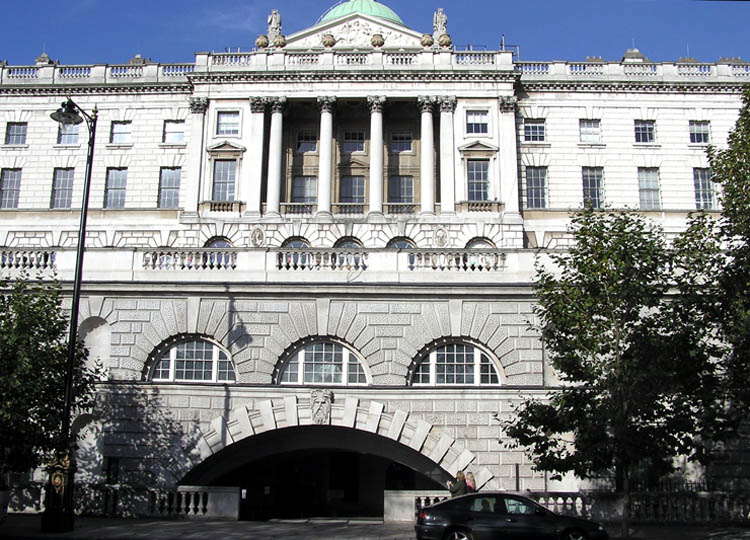
The riverfront of Somerset House seen from the Victoria Embankment (2004).

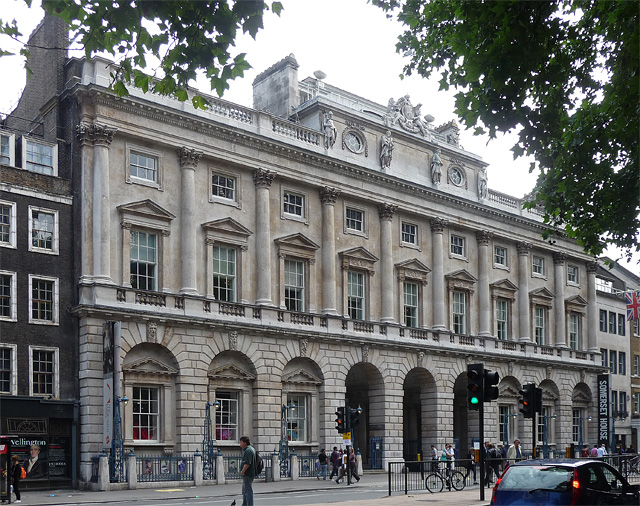
The Strand façade (2012).

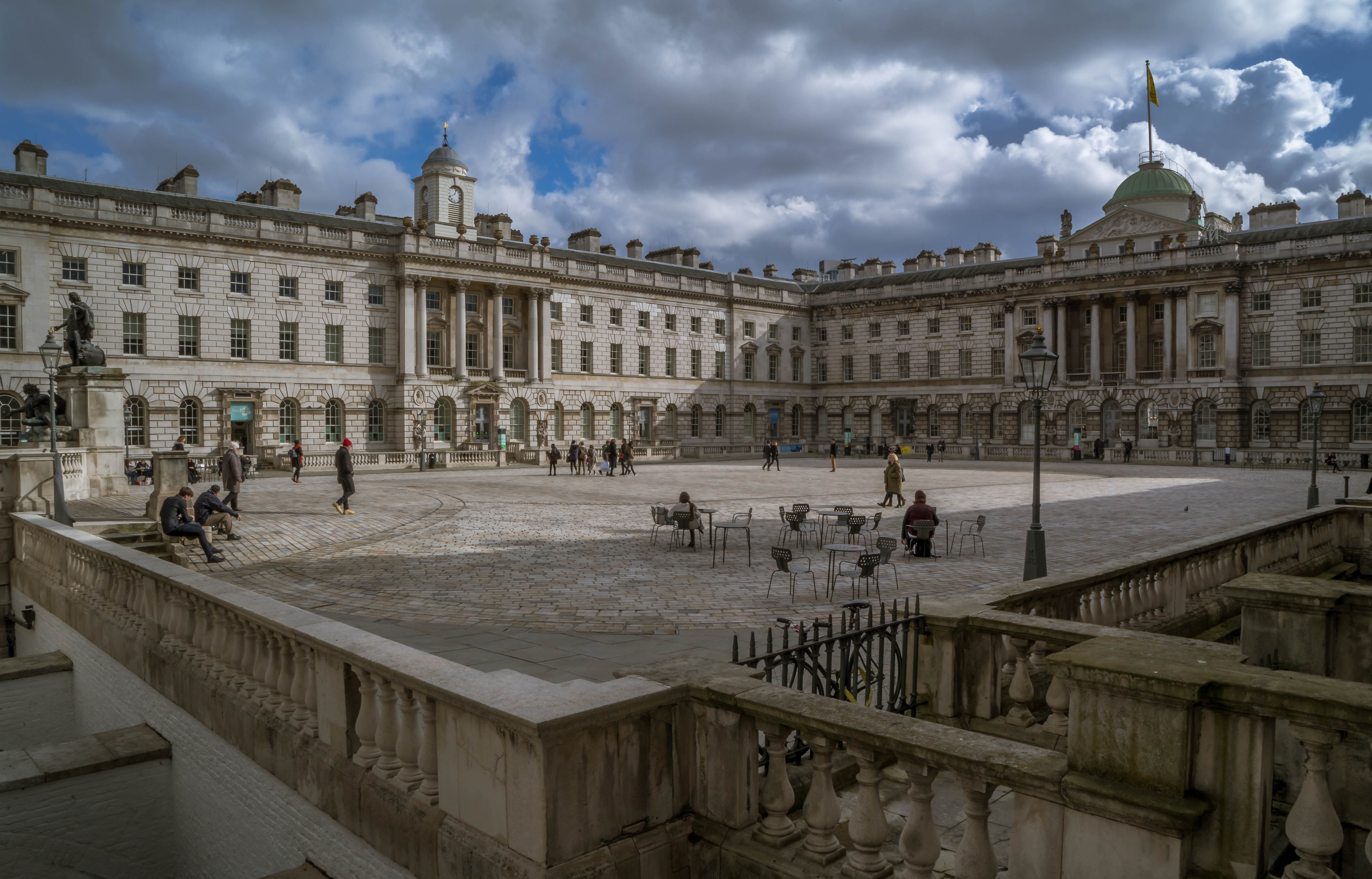
Courtyard view of the East and South wings (2016).
