= Robert Lloyd (courtier) =

Robert Lloyd (floruit 1600–1625) was a courtier and Member of Parliament. He was a Member of Parliament for Ludlow in 1614 and Minehead in 1621.

Lloyd was a "sewer" or server in the household of Anne of Denmark, the wife of James VI and I, and later became an administrator, as the queen's "Admiral".

Lloyd was knighted in 1616. In October 1617 the Queen dismissed him from her household, for obtaining property by deception. Nathaniel Brent wrote that when Lloyd enjoyed the queen's favour he slandered his colleagues in the household to her. Samuel Daniel lost his place as a groom of the queen's privy chamber for visiting him.

Lloyd bought the gatehouse of the Savoy Hospital in 1611, and owned a house in the vicinity of the Savoy and Hog Lane in London, known as Lloyd's Court, which he sold to Isaac Bringhurst in 1618.
