= Hymen's Triumph =

Hymen's Triumph is a pastoral play written by Samuel Daniel (1562–1619). It was performed at Somerset House in London on 3 February 1614 to celebrate the marriage of Robert Ker, 1st Lord Roxburghe and Jean Drummond, a lady-in-waiting of Anne of Denmark.

== Background ==
John Chamberlain had heard that Anne of Denmark would pay for the festivities at the wedding and a "Masque of Maids, if they may be found", but no more than £500 for a wedding-gown and a marriage bed because "her maid Drummond is rich enough otherwise, as well in wealth as in virtue and favour".

At first it was thought the wedding would take place at New Year, amid other festivities, including the wedding of Frances Howard and the Earl of Somerset. A Scottish courtier, Viscount Fenton, wrote:

the marriage of Summerset and she that was Ladye Essex shalbe at Christmas. Ther shalbe monye maskes, and it is thought that on the 12 daye the King shalbe at the Queins houss and geve it sume other name [Denmark House], and at that tyme Roxborow and Jeane Drummond shall be married.

Daniel may have been commissioned to write the masque for the occasion of the completion of the refurbishment of Anne of Denmark's palace at Somerset House, rather than specifically for Drummond's wedding. John Chamberlain suggested the palace would henceforth be called the Queen's Court.

The Queen's ushers, Zachary Bethell and John Tunstall prepared spaces for the entertainments. The masque and its setting in a courtyard of the palace on the Strand was described by the ambassador of Savoy, Giovanni Battista Gabaleone. The play was probably performed by professional actors. The wedding feast and Samuel Daniel's masque was said to have cost the queen £3,000, and it was an opportunity for her to show off the recent refurbishment of Somerset House, also known as Denmark House.

Hymen's Triumph is regarded as an early example of a play written for performance at a wedding. A manuscription version has a dedicatory sonnet describing the piece as one of the "worthy rites" of Drummond's wedding. It is however possible that the play was primarily commissioned by Anne of Denmark to celebrate the completion of recent refurbishments at Somerset House.

== Theme ==
Hymen, goddess of marriage, dressed as a shepherdess, encounters Envy, Avarice, and Jealousy. They resolve to disguise themselves in pastoral costume to frustrate Hymen's plans.

== Publication ==
The play was published as Hymens triumph A pastorall tragicomaedie. Presented at the Queenes court in the Strand, at her Maiesties magnificent entertainement of the Kings most excellent Maiestie, being at the nuptials of the Lord Roxborough (London, 1615).

The published work has a dedication to Anne of Denmark. A manuscript version with a dedication to Lady Roxburghe passed into the collection of William Drummond of Hawthornden who donated it to the library of the University of Edinburgh. This version is the source of the 1994 edition by John Pitcher.
