= Samuel Daniel =

English poet and playwright (1562–1619)

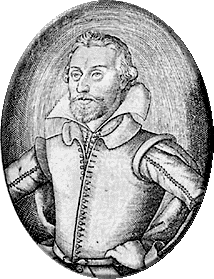
- Engraved likeness from the frontispiece for The Civil Wars (1609) by Thomas Cockson
- Born: 1562; Somerset, England
- Died: 1619 (aged 56–57); Beckington, England
- Resting place: St George's Church, Beckington (buried 14 October 1619)
- Education: Magdalen Hall (now Hertford College), Oxford
- Occupations: Poet, playwright, and historian
- Relatives: John Danyel (brother)
- Writing career
- Years active: 1585–1619
- Period: Late-Elizabethan and early-Jacobean eras
- Notable works: Delia; The Complaint of Rosamond; The Tragedy of Cleopatra; The Civil Wars; Musophilus; A Defence of Rhyme

Samuel Daniel (1562–1619) was an English poet, playwright and historian in the late-Elizabethan and early-Jacobean eras. He was an innovator in a wide range of literary genres. His best-known works are the sonnet cycle Delia, the epic poem The Civil Wars Between the Houses of Lancaster and York, the dialogue in verse Musophilus, and the essay on English poetry A Defence of Rhyme. He was considered one of the preeminent authors of his time, and his works had a significant influence on contemporary writers, including William Shakespeare. Daniel's writings continued to influence authors for centuries after his death, especially the Romantic poets Samuel Taylor Coleridge and William Wordsworth. C. S. Lewis called Daniel "the most interesting man of letters" whom the sixteenth century produced in England. George Eliot quoted from Musophilus, "Why should our pride make such a stir to be …", uncredited, in Middlemarch.

== Life and literary career ==
=== Early life, education, and relationship with John Florio ===
Little is known about Samuel Daniel's early life. Biographer Thomas Fuller in Histories of the Worthies of England (1662) states that he "was born not far from Taunton" in Somerset. The earliest evidence providing definitive details of his life is an entry in the signature book of Oxford University documenting his matriculation at Magdalen Hall (now Hertford College) on "17 Nov., 1581, aged 19". Daniel did not complete his degree at Oxford; Anthony à Wood in Athenae Oxonienses (1691) states that he "was more prone to easier and smoother studies, than in pecking and hewing at logic".

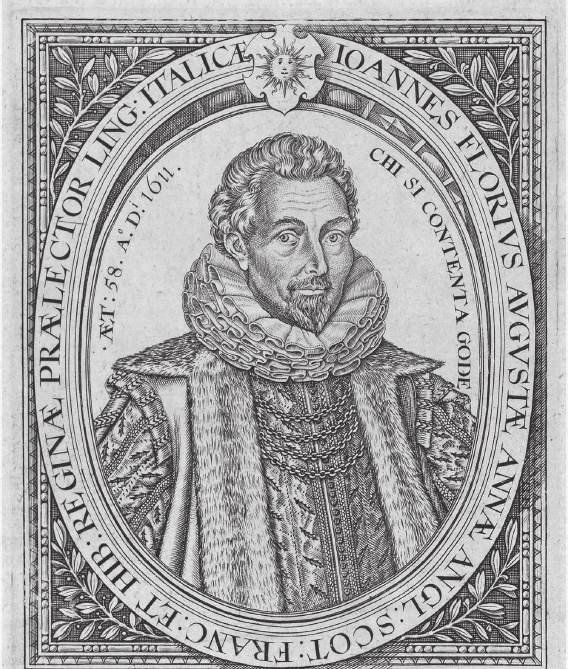
John Florio, engraving by William Hole, 1611. Daniel became friends with Florio at Oxford in the 1580s and decades later contributed a dedicatory verse to Florio's translation of Montaigne's Essays.

While at Oxford, Daniel met the author and translator John Florio, who was teaching Italian at the university at the time. In 1582, Daniel contributed a Latin verse to Florio's Giardino di Recreatione. Daniel maintained a relationship with Florio for years thereafter. He wrote a dedicatory poem that was included in Florio's translation of Michel de Montaigne's Essays in 1603. The second edition of Florio's Montaigne, published in 1613, included a revised version of Daniel's dedication in which the poet referred to Florio as "my dear friend and brother". This has led to the inference that either Florio had married Daniel's sister or Daniel had married Florio's sister, an inference that has never been proven.

=== 1585–1591: First published work and patronage of Sir Edward Dymoke ===
Daniel's first published work was The Worthy Tract of Paulus Jovius, a translation of an Italian treatise on impresa or emblems by historian Paolo Giovio. This emblem book was published in 1585 by Simon Waterson, who would remain Daniel's friend and principal publisher for the rest of his life. The Worthy Tract of Paulus Jovius was dedicated to Sir Edward Dymoke, the Queen's Champion. Daniel's association with Dymoke was the first of a series of close relationships with noble patrons that came to characterise the author's literary career.

Dymoke wrote a letter of introduction on Daniel's behalf which allowed the young student to live in the English embassy in France between 1585 and 1586 as he advanced his studies. Between 1590 and 1591, he returned to the continent, travelling part of the time accompanied by Dymoke. Daniel and Dymoke met the poet Giovanni Battista Guarini in Italy and defended English as a language worthy of poetry and great writers.

=== 1591–1593: Patronage of Mary Sidney, Delia, Rosamond, and Cleopatra ===
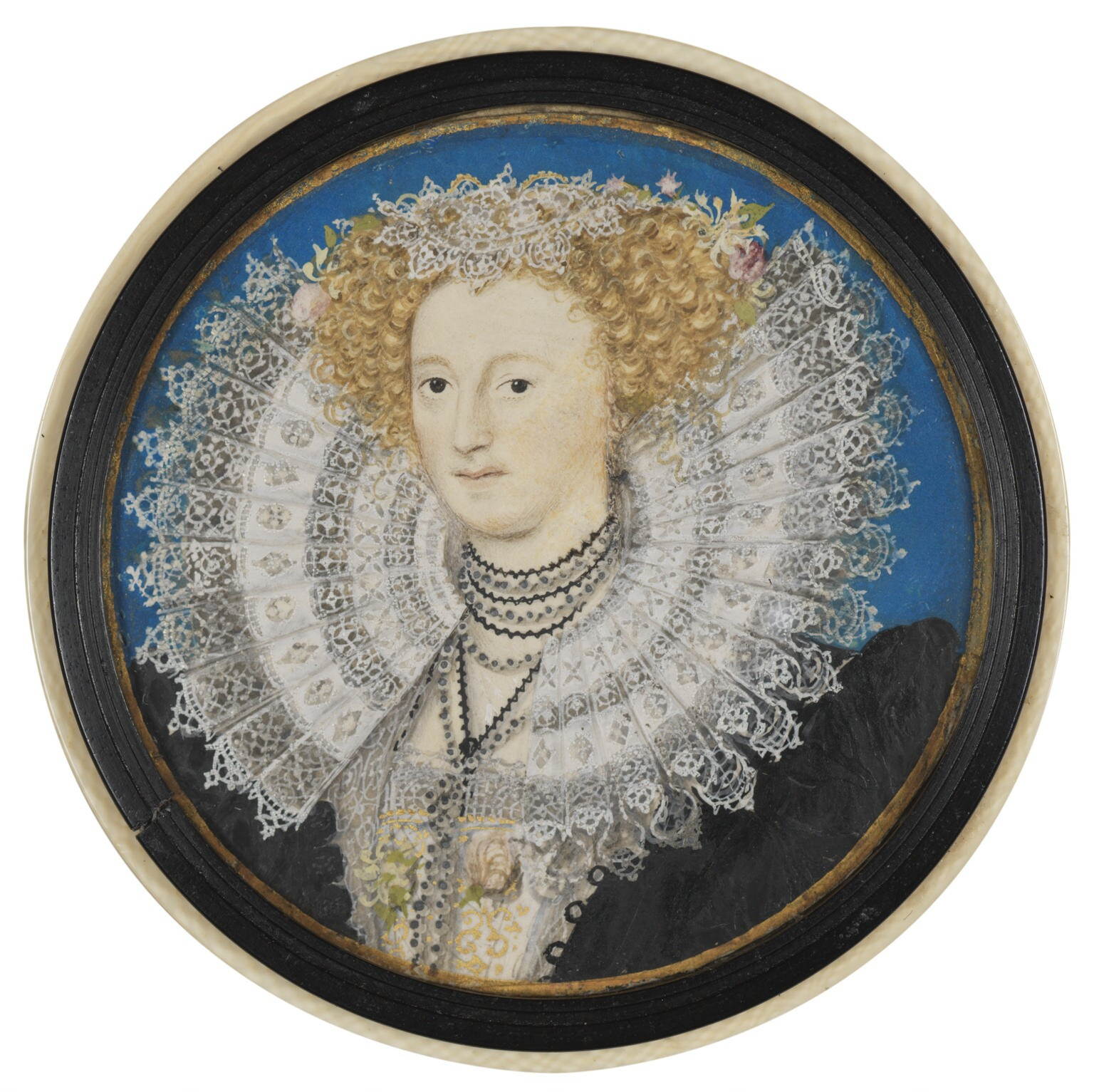
Portrait of Daniel's patron, Mary Sidney, the Countess of Pembroke, by Nicholas Hilliard, c. 1590. Daniel dedicated Delia and The Tragedy of Cleopatra to the Countess.

Daniel's literary career was effectively launched in late 1591 with the unauthorized inclusion of some of his Delia sonnets in the posthumous first edition of Sir Philip Sidney's Astrophel and Stella. Sidney's sister, Mary Sidney, the Countess of Pembroke, objected to the surreptitious publication of her brother's work, and the edition was recalled by the Stationers Company. In 1592, Daniel published the first authorized edition of his own poetic works, the sonnet cycle Delia, and the historical poem The Complaint of Rosamond. Daniel dedicated Delia to Mary Sidney and begged her forgiveness for the inclusion of his poems in the unauthorized edition of her brother's work, claiming that he had been "betrayed by the indiscretions of a greedy printer." Soon after the publication of Delia and Rosamond, Daniel was invited to join the Pembroke household, serving the family in some capacity, perhaps as tutor to the twelve-year-old William Herbert. He also joined a group of writers encouraged by Mary Sidney that has come to be referred to as the Wilton Circle, a group that included Edmund Spenser, Michael Drayton, Sir John Davies, and Abraham Fraunce.

Immediately upon the publication of Delia and Rosamond, Daniel began receiving praise from English poets and scholars, including Thomas Nashe, Thomas Churchyard, and Gabriel Harvey. Edmund Spenser, at the time England's most highly regarded living author, endorsed Daniel in Colin Clouts Come Home Again (1595), stating that "there is a new shepherd late upsprung, / The which doth all afore him far surpass" and imploring his fellow poet to "rouse thy feathers quickly, Daniel, / And to what course thou please thyself advance".

From 1592 to 1593, under the patronage of Mary Sidney, Daniel completed The Tragedy of Cleopatra, which was published in 1594. The play was written at the request of Sidney as a sequel to Robert Garnier's French tragedy Marc-Antoine, a play she had translated into English as The Tragedy of Antony and published in 1592. Both plays were written in the style of classical closet drama, plays more intended to be read than performed. During the early to mid-twentieth century literary critics postulated that the plays were part of Mary Sidney's effort to reform English theater, returning it to classical standards espoused by her brother, Philip Sidney, in his Defence of Poesy. This view of Mary Sidney's work was advanced by T. S. Eliot in his 1932 essay, "Apology for the Countess of Pembroke". Subsequent literary criticism, however, has suggested that Sidney's literary efforts were not part of a campaign against English drama, but rather were efforts to adapt continental works on history for an English audience and use them for contemporary political commentary.

=== 1594–1601: Mountjoy, Civil Wars, Poetical Essays, and Works ===
After the publication of Cleopatra, Daniel parted ways with Mary Sidney and experienced financial difficulties. He was taken in by Charles Blount, Baron Mountjoy, as described in the first edition of Daniel's epic poem about the Wars of the Roses, The First Four Books of the Civil Wars Between the Two Houses of Lancaster and York, published in 1595. The poem included complimentary references to Mountjoy and a section praising him and his close friend Robert Devereux, the Earl of Essex. Daniel had worked at Essex's estate, Wanstead, as he wrote the initial version of his poem.

Between 1595 and 1599, Daniel added a fifth book to The Civil Wars and included the expanded poem in The Poetical Essays of Samuel Daniel, a collection of his works dedicated to Mountjoy and published in 1599. The collection included revised versions of Delia, Rosamond, and Cleopatra, as well as two new works, Musophilus and A Letter From Octavia to Marcus Antonius. Musophilus was dedicated to Daniel's friend and fellow poet Fulke Greville, whose discussions with Daniel had inspired the dialogue in verse, a debate between a poet and a courtier on the value of writing poetry relative to more worldly pursuits. A Letter from Octavia was dedicated to Margaret Clifford, the Countess of Cumberland, whose relationship with her philandering husband inspired Daniel's sympathetic portrayal of Mark Antony's wife, Octavia. The use of the word "Essays" in the title of the collection may have been inspired by Montaigne's French work that had used the same word in its title. Like Montaigne's writings, Daniel's collection included works that debated topics in a contemplative, self-reflective style.

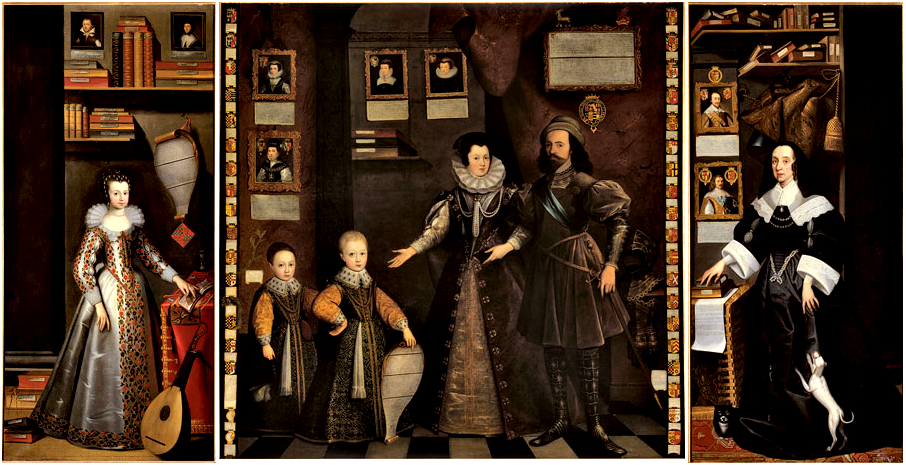
The Great Picture, a triptych commissioned in 1646 by Anne Clifford and attributed to Jan van Belcamp (1610–1653). It depicts Clifford as a girl at left and as a mature woman at right. The left panel includes a portrait of her childhood tutor, Samuel Daniel.

During the late 1590s to first years of the 1600s, Daniel took on the role of tutor to the young Anne Clifford, daughter of the Countess of Cumberland, the woman to whom he had dedicated A Letter to Octavia. Anne Clifford maintained a sense of gratitude and affection toward Daniel through the rest of her life. She included his portrait and volumes of his works in the family triptych she commissioned that has come to be known as The Great Picture.

In 1601, a new collection of Daniel's writings was published titled The Works of Samuel Daniel, Newly Augmented. Once again, the collection contained revised editions of his earlier works, including an expanded version of The Civil Wars that now extended to a sixth book. The Civil Wars was newly dedicated to Queen Elizabeth, likely reflecting Daniel's elevated stature as one of the leading poets of the day, regarded by some as the successor to Edmund Spenser, who had died in 1599.

=== 1603–1607: Royal patronage, Philotas, and the death of Mountjoy ===
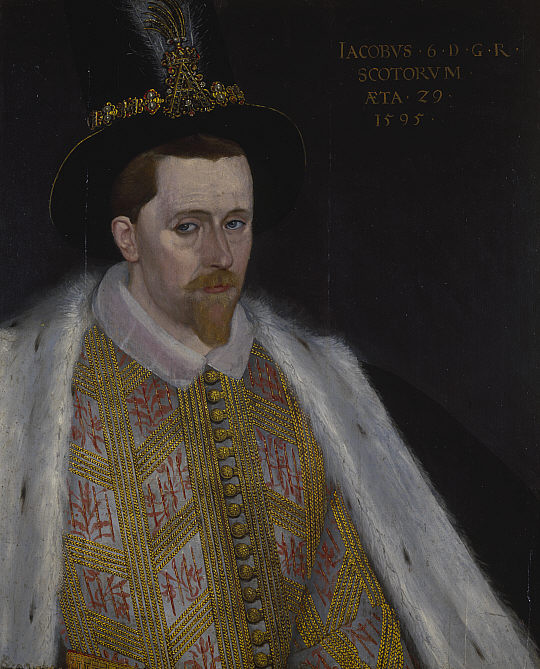
King James I

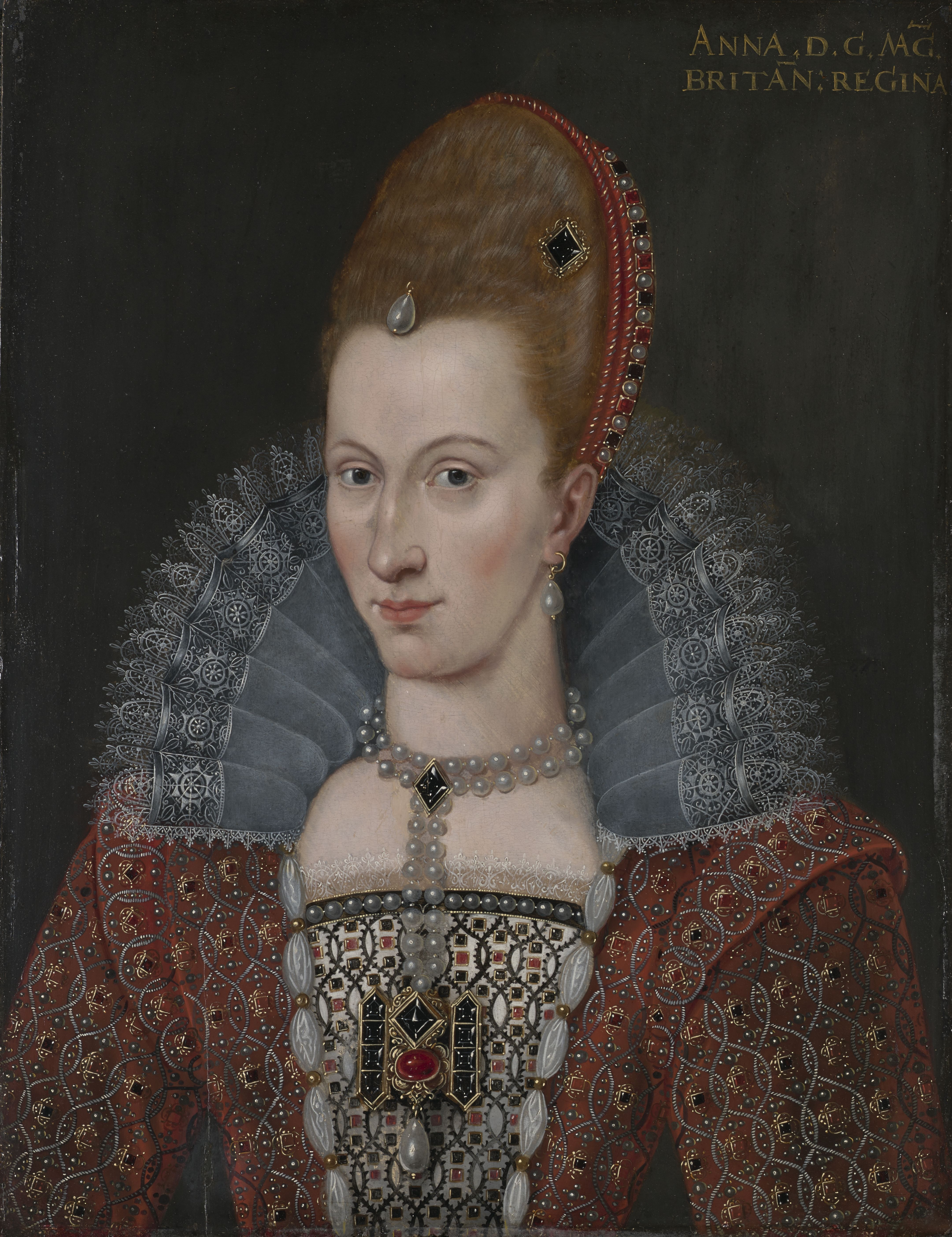
Anne of Denmark

King James I of England, and the Queen Consort, Anne of Denmark. Daniel presented his Panegyrick Congratulatory to James upon his accession in 1603. By 1607, Daniiel was appointed "One of the Grooms of Her Majesty's Privy Chamber".

After Queen Elizabeth's death and King James's accession in 1603, Daniel quickly became associated with the new court. Through the support of Lucy Russell, Countess of Bedford, he presented his Panegyrick Congratulatory to the King's Most Excellent Majesty to the new king at Burley House on 23 April 1603. A revised version of the poem was published later in 1603, along with Daniel's Epistles addressed to various members of the nobility and his essay A Defence of Rhyme.

Daniel became closely associated with King James's queen, Anne (or Anna) of Denmark, who commissioned him to write a masque, The Vision of the Twelve Goddesses, which was performed at Hampton Court in January 1604. In February of that year, Daniel was appointed the licenser of plays for the Children of the Queen's Revels, giving him the responsibility of reviewing the plays presented to the court. This appointment ultimately led to the only known significant difficulty and embarrassment that Daniel encountered in his literary career. Two controversial plays The Dutch Courtesan and Eastward Ho! were both performed by the Children of the Queen's Revels after having been approved by Daniel. More disturbingly for Daniel, his own play, The Tragedy of Philotas, performed before King James in January 1605, was believed to include political commentary on the seditious end of the Earl of Essex, who had been executed in 1601. Daniel was called before the Privy Council to defend himself. Although he was acquitted of any charges, the incident caused him great embarrassment, resulting in written apologies to his longtime friend Charles Blount (formerly Baron Mountjoy, then the Earl of Devonshire), whom he had inadvertently pulled into the affair, and to Robert Cecil, King James's advisor and Secretary of State. In an epistle to Prince Henry, that accompanied the 1605 printed version of Philotas, Daniel reflected his new world-weary perspective, stating that "years hath done this wrong, / To make me write too much, and live too long."

If the controversy surrounding Philotas damaged Daniel's reputation with King James, the damage was short-lived. In 1605, the play was included in the published collection of his works, Certain Small Poems, and in August his pastoral tragicomedy The Queen's Arcadia was performed before Queen Anne and Prince Henry at Christ Church in Oxford.

In April 1606, Daniel's friend and patron, Charles Blount, died. Daniel wrote a funeral poem to his longtime supporter that was printed as A Funeral Poem Upon the Death of the Noble Earl of Devonshire and included in the 1607 edition of Daniel's Certain Small Works. The title page of that collection of Daniel's works was the first to refer to him as "one of the Grooms of the Queen's Majesty's Privy Chamber", an elevated status that he shared with his friend John Florio. Certain Small Works included a substantially revised edition of The Tragedy of Cleopatra, one that has been thought to be more performable on stage than the original closet drama version. Recent scholarship has identified a painting of a noblewoman dressed as Cleopatra as being a portrait of Anne Clifford dressed as the Egyptian queen, perhaps associated with a staged performance of the 1607 version of Daniel's play.

=== 1609–1619: Final version of Civil Wars, country life, prose History, and death ===
In 1609, Daniel published his final version of The Civil Wars, a work that now extended to eight books. Daniel dedicated the work to Mary Sidney, the patron who had helped first bring him to prominence. In the dedication to the epic poem, he stated that he had intended to continue the work "unto the glorious union of Henry VII", meaning the marriage of Henry Tudor (Queen Elizabeth's grandfather) to Elizabeth of York in 1486. The final version of the poem, however, only extended through Edward IV's marriage to Elizabeth Woodville in 1464. In the dedication, Daniel also stated that he intended to write a prose "History of England, from the Conquest", introducing the principal project that was to occupy the rest of his literary career and life.

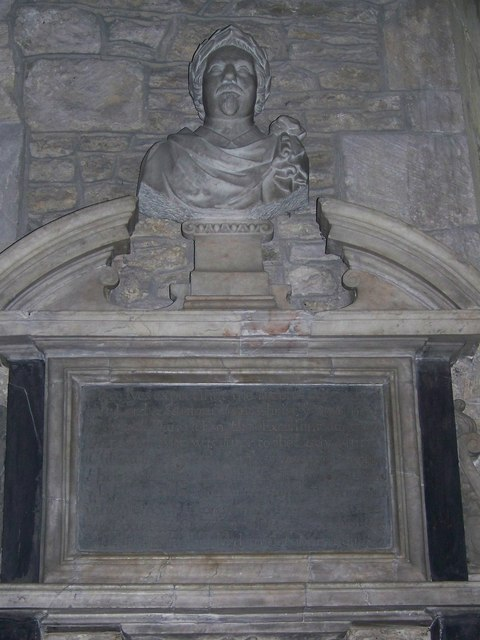
Memorial to Samuel Daniel at St George's Church, Beckington in Somerset

Daniel spent most of the final decade of his life in semi-retirement, living at a country house in the small hamlet of Ridge (now Rudge) in the village of Beckington in Somerset. In 1610, he wrote the masque Tethys' Festival, which was performed at Whitehall to celebrate the investiture of King James's son, Henry, as Prince of Wales. During the next few years, Daniel conducted research on English history, relying in part on the expertise and collections of his friends, the antiquarians William Camden and Robert Cotton. In 1612, he published the first instalment of his prose history, The First Part of the History of England, an edition covering the early years of England's history, from the Norman Conquest (1066) through the end of the reign of King Stephen (1154). In 1614, he wrote the pastoral play, Hymen's Triumph, which was performed to celebrate the wedding of Jane Drummond to Robert Ker, 1st Earl of Roxburghe at Queen Anne's new palace, Somerset House.

Daniel was said to have lost his place as a groom of the privy chamber to Anne of Denmark in 1618 for visiting a disgraced courtier, Robert Lloyd alias Flood.

The final version of Daniel's prose history, The Collection of the History of England was published in 1618. It included material from The First Part of the History and continued from the point where that work had left off through the end of the reign of Edward III (1377).

The final work that Daniel wrote was a poem addressed to James Montague, Bishop of Winchester, in 1618. It was intended to console the Bishop who was suffering from jaundice. The work suggests that Daniel may have been suffering from the same illness; he says of "this close vanquishing / And secret wasting sickness" that he had "struggled with it too".

It is unclear if Daniel was ever married. The burial of a "Mrs. Daniell" is recorded in the Beckington register in March 1619, seven months before Daniel's death; however, it is unknown if this was the author's wife. Daniel executed his will on 4 September 1619 and died the following month; he was buried on 14 October 1619 at St George's Church in Beckington. In the 1650s, Daniel's old student, Anne Clifford, had a memorial monument erected to honour him at the church.

== Works ==
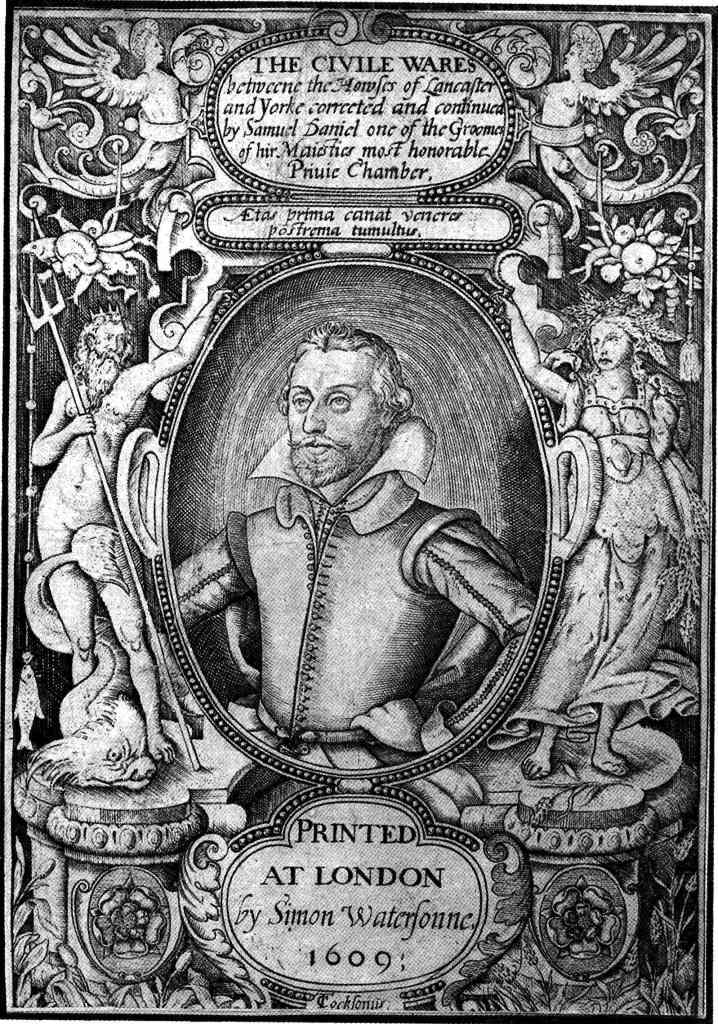
Frontispiece engraving for The Civil Wars (1609) by Thomas Cockson

Many of Samuel Daniel's poems and plays were reprinted multiple times in collections of his writings during his lifetime, often in substantially revised editions that represented distinct versions of the works. The following list of Daniel's major works demonstrates the breadth of his writing, both in terms of subject and genre. Included in the list is a brief description of the work, the volume and year in which it originally appeared, and the years of significant revisions:

- Delia – Sonnet cycle. Portions published in Philip Sidney's Astrophel & Stella (1591). First published in a complete, authorized version in Delia and The Complaint of Rosamond (1592), and in a second revised edition in the same year. Revised, expanded versions published in Delia and Rosamond Augmented. Cleopatra (1594) and The Works of Samuel Daniel Newly Augmented (1601).
- The Complaint of Rosamond – Long historical poem (epyllion) about Rosamund Clifford, the mistress of King Henry II. First published in Delia and The Complaint of Rosamond (1592) and in a second revised edition in that same year. Revised, expanded version published in Delia and Rosamond Augmented. Cleopatra (1594).
- The Tragedy of Cleopatra – Senecan, closet drama about Cleopatra's suicide following the death of Mark Antony. First published in Delia and Rosamond Augmented. Cleopatra (1594). Substantially revised in Certain Small Works Heretofore Divulged by Samuel Daniel, Now Again Corrected and Augmented (1607).
- The Civil Wars Between the Houses of Lancaster and York – Epic poem on the series of conflicts that have come to be called "The Wars of the Roses", modeled on Lucan's Pharsalia. Four books published as The First Four Books of the Civil Wars (1595). Earlier manuscripts of Books 1 to 2 and Book 3 survive that include substantively different versions of those portions of the poem. A fifth book was added between 1595 and 1599 and is included in The Civil Wars in The Poetical Essays of Samuel Daniel (1599). A sixth book was added to the poem in The Works of Samuel Daniel, Newly Augmented (1601). The final version of the poem, expanded to eight books, was published, on its own, in 1609.
- Musophilus, or A Defence of All Learning – Long dialogue in verse between a poet (Musophilus – lover of the muses) and a courtier (Philocosmus – lover of the world). First published in The Poetical Essays of Samuel Daniel (1599). Substantially revised and shortened in Certain Small Works Heretofore Divulged by Samuel Daniel, Now Again Corrected and Augmented (1607).
- A Letter from Octavia to Marcus Antonius – Epistolary historical poem. First published in 1599 in The Poetical Essays of Samuel Daniel.
- A Panegyrick Congratulatory to the King's Most Excellent Majesty – Poem delivered to King James on his accession to the crown of England, published in A Panegyrick Congratulatory Delivered to the King's Excellent Majesty, Also Certain Epistles, With a Defence of Rhyme (1603).
- Epistles – Advisory letters, in verse, addressed to Sir Thomas Egerton (Lord Keeper of the Great Seal of England), Lord Henry Howard (One of His Majesty's Privy Council), Lady Margaret Clifford (Countess of Cumberland), Lady Lucy Russell (Countess of Bedford), Lady Anne Clifford, and Henry Wriothesley (Earl of Southampton). First published in A Panegyrick Congratulatory Delivered to the King's Excellent Majesty, Also Certain Epistles, With a Defence of Rhyme (1603).
- A Defence of Rhyme – Prose treatise defending the English verse's lack of adherence to classical standards, a response to Thomas Campion's Observations in the Art of English Poesie (1602). First published in A Panegyrick Congratulatory Delivered to the King's Excellent Majesty, Also Certain Epistles, With a Defence of Rhyme (1603).
- The Vision of the Twelve Goddesses – One of the first masques to be presented to the Stuart court. A surreptitious edition was published in 1604 as The True Description of a Royal Masque, the year of its presentation at Hampton, and Daniel's authorized version was published that same year.
- Ulysses and the Siren – Short poem debating the attributes of an active compared to a contemplative life. First published in Certain Small Poems (1605).
- The Tragedy of Philotas – Play in verse combining closet drama with elements of the popular stage. First published in Certain Small Poems (1605).
- The Queen's Arcadia – Play in verse, tragicomic romance in the style of Italian pastoral drama. First published, on its own, in 1606.
- A Funeral Poem Upon the Death of the Noble Earl of Devonshire – Valedictory poem upon the death of Charles Blount, Baron Mountjoy, who was created the Earl of Devonshire in 1603 and died in 1606. The poem was published, on its own, in the year of Blount's death. A revised version was included in Certain Small Works (1607).
- Tethys' Festival – Masque to celebrate the investiture of James's son, Prince Henry, as Prince of Wales, in June 1610. Published in the year of its performance, in The Order and Solemnity of the Creation of the High and Mighty Prince Henry, Eldest Son to Our Sacred Sovereign, Prince of Wales. In the preface accompanying the printed edition, Daniel stated that the "art and invention" of the designer of the performance, Inigo Jones, was of "the greatest grace, and is of most importance: ours, the least part and of least note."
- Hymen's Triumph – Pastoral play presented at the marriage of Jean Drummond to Robert Ker of Cressford, Lord Roxborough in 1614. Published in 1615.
- Collection of the History of England – Prose history of England from its earliest documented days, pre-Norman conquest, through the reign of Edward III. The first portion was published in 1612 as The First Part of the History of England. The final version was published in 1618 and represented the last of Daniel's works published during his lifetime.

In 1623, the same year as the publication of Shakespeare's First Folio, Samuel Daniel's younger brother, John Danyel, a lute player and composer in King James's court, oversaw the publication of a collection of his brother's poetry in an edition titled The Whole Works of Samuel Daniel Esquire in Poetry. The collection was dedicated to King James's son, Prince Charles. It included copies of the 1609 edition of The Civil Wars, and newly printed editions of Daniel's other verse works, each generally with their own title page dated 1623 but based upon the final versions published during the poet's life.

== Daniel and Shakespeare ==
William Shakespeare (1564–1616), the Chandos portrait. Daniel and Shakespeare were contemporaries. Daniel's influence can be detected in many of Shakespeare's plays and poems.

Samuel Daniel was born a year or two before William Shakespeare and died three years after him. The literary careers of both started in the 1590s and ended in the 1610s. Both writers enjoyed success and came to be regarded as leading authors of the period, though Shakespeare was more associated with the popular stage and Daniel with courtly poetry and noble patrons. Literary scholars generally accept that many of Shakespeare's plays and poems were influenced by Samuel Daniel's works, while the possible influence of Shakespeare's plays on Daniel's works has been more subject to debate.

Samuel Daniel scholar John Pitcher states, "One measure of Daniel's quality and importance as a writer is the assiduousness with which Shakespeare followed and drew freely on his every publication. ... But it would be deeply unfair to leave Daniel in Shakespeare's wake".

=== Daniel's influence on Shakespeare ===
Evidence of the influence of Daniel's works on Shakespeare includes the following:

- Rosamond and The Rape of Lucrece – Literary critics cite Daniel's The Complaint of Rosamond as one of the principal sources of inspiration for Shakespeare's composition of The Rape of Lucrece. One of the similarities between the two that is often cited is Rosamond's description of a seduction scene on an engraved box in Rosamond which has close parallels to Lucrece's narrative of a similar scene in a tapestry or painting in Lucrece.
- Delia and Shakespeare's sonnets – Numerous parallels between Shakespeare's sonnets and Delia suggest that Daniel's sequence served as an inspiration and model for Shakespeare as he composed his poems. Daniel employed the sonnet structure that has come to be called "Shakespearean", three quatrains and a final couplet, before Shakespeare did. Daniel's pairing of a sonnet sequence with a complaint in Delia and The Complaint of Rosamond, a structure that has come to be described as "Delian", may have inspired the pairing of A Lover's Complaint with Shakespeare's sonnets in the 1609 edition of Shakespeare's sonnets. If William Herbert is the "W.H." in the dedication to the 1609 edition of Shakespeare's sonnets and is the "fair youth" of the sonnets, then Daniel, who worked in the Herbert household, may be one of the models for the "rival poet".
- Rosamond and Romeo and Juliet – Romeo's final speech over the lifeless body of Juliet from Romeo and Juliet ("And lips, O you / The doors of breath, seal with a righteous kiss"), written between 1593 and 1596, are generally accepted to have been inspired by some of the concluding stanzas of The Complaint of Rosamond ("This sorrowing farewell of a dying kiss"), published in 1592.
- The First Four Books of the Civil Wars and Richard II – Shakespeare's Richard II includes many elements that the playwright would not have found in his historical sources that appear similarly in The First Four Books of the Civil Wars, printed in 1595. These include the representation of Richard's queen, Isabel, as a mature woman (rather than the historical child of ten years of age), details of the Bishop of Carlyle's defence of Richard before Parliament, Richard and Isabel's tearful parting, Richard entering London behind Bolingbroke as his prisoner, and the depiction of Richard in prison philosophically musing on his fallen state. The appearance of the first print edition of Daniel's epic poem has been used to establish the earliest possible date for Shakespeare's composition of Richard II as mid- to late 1595. Recent analysis of an extant early manuscript of Daniel's poem, however, suggests that Shakespeare could have used such a manuscript as a source, making an earlier date possible.
- The First Four Books of the Civil Wars and Henry IV, Part 1 – In Henry IV, Part 1, Shakespeare depicts Prince Hal and Hotspur as being around the same age and makes a rivalry between the two a central part of the play. Historically, Hotspur was as old as Hal's father and the prince was only sixteen years old at the Battle of Shrewsbury at which he gained military experience but did not play a significant role. The playwright seems to have been inspired by similar ahistorical elements of the depiction of the prince in Daniel's First Four Books of the Civil Wars.
- The First Four Books of the Civil Wars and Henry IV, Part 2 – There are close parallels between Henry's deathbed scene in Shakespeare's play and Daniel's description of the king's death in his poem.
- The First Four Books of the Civil Wars and Henry V – In The First Four Books of the Civil Wars, the ghost of Henry V requests that some poet write the story of his glorious victories, "Whence new immortal Iliads might proceed" (Book IV, stanza 6). Scholars believe that this served as part of Shakespeare's inspiration for using a Chorus and what Geoffrey Bullough called "the energy of the epic" in Henry V, a play that emphasizes the king's victory at the Battle of Agincourt.
- The First Four Books of the Civil Wars and Shakespeare's possible revisions to the Henry VI plays – If the Henry VI plays were revised by Shakespeare in 1595 or later, as is suggested in The New Oxford Shakespeare Authorship Companion, elements of those plays that include parallels to The First Four Books of the Civil Wars may indicate the influence of Daniel's work on Shakespeare's revisions.
- Musophilus and Julius Caesar – Shakespeare's Julius Caesar includes echoes of Daniel's poem Musophilus which was published around the time when the playwright was writing the play.
- The Tragedy of Cleopatra and Antony and Cleopatra – Supplementing his principal source, Plutarch's Lives, Shakespeare took inspiration from Daniel's Senecan tragedy for his complex characterization of the Egyptian queen Cleopatra, especially for the scenes surrounding her suicide in Act 5 of the play. Daniel's poem A Letter from Octavia may have also provided material for Shakespeare's sympathetic portrayal of Antony's wife.
- Paulus Jovius and Pericles – The image of a down-turned torch in Pericles may have been inspired by an emblem described by Daniel in The Worthy Tract of Paulus Jovius. The wording used in the play to describe the device closely mirrors Daniel's in his translation of Paolo Giovo. Elements of the image are also used in Shakespeare's sonnet 73.
- Daniel's masques and The Tempest – The masque in Shakespeare's The Tempest may have been influenced by Daniel's Vision of the Twelve Goddesses and Tethys' Festival, which included similar Greek deities, such as Ceres and Juno.

=== Shakespeare's influence on Daniel ===
Evidence of Shakespeare's possible influence on Daniel's works includes the following:

- Henry VI plays and The First Four Books of the Civil Wars – Laurence Michel, in his 1958 critical edition of Samuel Daniel's The Civil Wars, stated, "The likelihood that Daniel knew Shakespeare or any of his works before at least 1604 is small" and therefore "we may assume that Daniel did not know" the versions of the Henry VI plays that were printed in the 1590s. More recent research, however, has suggested that elements of The First Four Books of the Civil Wars may reflect the influence of the Henry VI plays. Those plays had been performed by Pembroke's Men, the acting company sponsored by Henry Herbert, the husband of Daniel's patron, Mary Sidney, before the 1595 publication of the first edition of Daniel's epic poem. Among the strongest evidence of influence is Daniel's inclusion of a romantic relationship between Queen Margaret and the Duke of Suffolk, including a woeful parting scene between the two. These elements of the poem are unsupported by his chronicle sources but are emphasized in Henry VI, Part 2. If Daniel incorporated elements of the Henry VI plays into The First Four Books of the Civil Wars, it may be the first instance of another author reflecting the influence of Shakespeare's plays in his or her own work.
- Richard II and Daniel's revisions to The Civil Wars – In the 1609 edition of The Civil Wars, Daniel describes Henry IV's repudiation of Richard II's murderer, Sir Piers of Exton (III.79). This incident is not mentioned in his chronicle sources but is emphasized in Shakespeare's Richard II.
- Henry IV plays and Daniel's revisions to The Civil Wars – In the 1609 edition of The Civil Wars, Daniel expanded the material formerly included in the third book and broke it into two books, now Books III and IV. The bulk of the added material concerned the reign of King Henry IV and seems to have been influenced by Shakespeare's plays on that king's reign.
- Henry VI plays and Book VIII of The Civil Wars (1609) – The eighth book of The Civil Wars, added in the 1609 edition, includes two sections that suggest the influence of Henry VI, Part 3: Edward IV's wooing of Lady Grey and Henry on the molehill at the Battle of Towton.
- Antony and Cleopatra and Daniel's revisions to The Tragedy of Cleopatra – There is debate surrounding the extent to which Daniel may have been influenced by Shakespeare's play in his 1607 revisions to The Tragedy of Cleopatra. Daniel incorporated elements that made his play more "theatrical", yet the revised version remains closer to neoclassical Senecan tragedy than popular theater. The detail of Antony's servant, Eros, having been freed by Antony seems to confirm influence.
- Henry V and Funeral Poem Upon the Death of the Noble Earl of Devonshire – Elements of Daniel's characterization of Charles Blount as a hero-warrior include echoes of Shakespeare's Henry V, especially in the section on Blount rallying the English troops at the siege of Kinsale.

=== Personal relationship ===
An essay by Albert Harthshorne in 1899 in The Archaeological Journal reported that during his retirement, Daniel "received his friends, among them Shakespeare, Chapman, Marlowe of the 'mighty line', Drayton, and Jonson". The facts that Christopher Marlowe had died in 1593, many years before Daniel's retirement, and that Daniel had an acrimonious relationship with Jonson, casts doubt on the comment as a whole. There is no direct evidence that Daniel was friendly with Shakespeare or knew him personally, although they likely shared many common acquaintances, including John Florio, Henry Wriothesley, William Herbert, and Ben Jonson.

== Literary reputation and style ==
During his lifetime, Daniel was regarded as one of the most important English authors of the period. His writings contributed innovations to a wide range of literary genres, including the sonnet cycle (Delia), the complaint (Complaint of Rosamond), neo-classical drama (Tragedy of Cleopatra), the epic (The Civil Wars), the verse colloquy (Musophilus), the literary essay ("Defence of Rhyme"), and epistolary verse (Certain Epistles). He continued to have admirers for centuries after his death and his works had a significant influence on many other authors. John Milton adapted elements of his works in Paradise Lost. Alexander Pope parodied the opening of The Civil Wars in The Rape of the Lock. Samuel Taylor Coleridge was a particular admirer of Daniel's work, referring to him as "one of the golden writers of our golden Elizabethan age ... whose diction bears no mark of time". Coleridge's friend and collaborator William Wordsworth reflected Daniel's influence in many of his works and included an extended quotation from Daniel's Epistle to the Countess of Cumberland in his poem The Excursion. Henry David Thoreau referred to Daniel to elucidate his own thoughts in A Week on the Concord and Merrimack Rivers.

Although Daniel's work fell into obscurity during the 20th century, he continued to have admirers. Many anthologies of early modern literature include excerpts from his Delia, Musophilus, and A Defence of Rhyme. In his 1944 English Literature in the Sixteenth Century, Excluding Drama, C. S. Lewis said of Daniel that he "actually thinks in verse; thinks deeply, arduously; he can doubt and wrestle ... he is the most interesting man of letters whom that century produced in England."

One factor that contributes to the diminished recognition of Daniel's works in the 20th century, relative to some of his contemporaries, is his calmer, less emotional style. As reflected in C. S. Lewis's assessment that Daniel "thinks in verse", his poetry often employs the more precise language of debate, self-doubt, and deep thought rather than passionate imagery. In Musophilus, Daniel described his poetry as "a speaking picture of the mind" (line 170). The conversational, less lyrical nature of his poetry resulted in criticism, even from the time when he wrote. Fellow poet Michael Drayton, a contemporary of Daniel's, called him "too much historian in verse" and stated that "His rimes were smooth, his meters well did close, / But yet his manner better fitted prose". Yet those same qualities of his writing are what helped him appeal to Coleridge and Wordsworth, who in their prelude to Lyrical Ballads (1802) asserted that "a large portion of the language of every good poem can in no respect differ from that of good prose". In Biographia Literaria (1817), Coleridge praised Daniel's poetry for "many and exquisite specimens of that style which, as the neutral ground of prose and verse, is common to both." At the time that Coleridge and Wordsworth were writing, Daniel's "prosaic" style seemed more current than that of many other Elizabethan poets. The 18th century literary critic Robert Anderson expressed this in his 1795 anthology Works of the British Poets. Anderson wrote of Daniel that there is "in both his poetry and prose such a legitimate rational flow of language, as approaches nearer the style of the 18th than the 16th century".

Aspects of Daniel's writing may also be closer to the 20th and 21st century than to his own time. Much of his work expresses a sympathy for the plight of women who maintain their dignity despite being regarded as the subordinates of undeserving men. He exhibited this attitude in his dedicatory verses to Mary Sidney, his poem Letter from Octavia, and especially in his Epistle to Countess of Cumberland. The pensive, self-reflective style of much of his poetry is more similar to some modern poetry than the more ornate style of many of his contemporaries. His belief that every culture and era had value to offer in its thought and writing, reflected in A Defence of Rhyme, and refusal to accept that poetry and art should be artificially held to classical standards, differed from the attitude of many humanist writers and thinkers of his time. In Musophilus, he demonstrated the foresight to see the benefit of writing in English, even though the use of the language was restricted to one small island. He presciently wrote, "who in time knows whither we may vent / The treasure of our tongue ... Or who can tell for what great work in hand / The greatness of our style is now ordained" (lines 947 to 954).

Daniel also had the humility to admit that he, along with all humans, is fallible and is prone to hold strongly to opinions that will come to be regarded as misguided. This humility is demonstrated in the following comment from his Collection of the History of England:

Pardon us antiquity, if we miscensure your actions which are ever (as those of men) according to the vogue, and sway of times, and have only their upholding by the opinion of the present. We deal with you but as posterity will with us (which ever thinks itself the wiser) that will judge likewise of our errors according to the cast of their imaginations.

— Collection of the History of England (1618), p. 101

In many of his works, Daniel expressed a deep regard for the power of written language ("blessed letters") to reach across cultures and generations. As he wrote in Musophilus:

O blessed letters that combine in one
All ages past, and make one live with all,
By you we do confer with who are gone,
And the dead living unto counsel call:
By you th'unborn shall have communion
Of what we feel, and what doth us befall.

— Musophilus (lines 181 to 186)

== Modern editions and recent references to Daniel ==
The last time a thorough edition of the works of Daniel appeared in print was in the late nineteenth century, in the five-volume Complete Works in Verse and Prose (1885–1896), edited by Alexander Balloch Grosart. Two collections of selected works were published during the twentieth century: Poems and a Defence of Ryme (1930), an edition that preserves the original early modern spelling and punctuation, edited by Arthur Colby Sprague, and Selected Poetry and a Defense of Rhyme (1998), a modernized edition, edited by Geoffrey G. Hiller and Peter L. Groves. John Pitcher is currently working on a multi-volume critical edition of Daniel's complete works to be published by Oxford University Press.

Daniel's Tragedy of Cleopatra was staged by the University College London (UCL) Centre for Modern Exchanges in 2013 as part of a project to evaluate if the "closet drama" was performable. A recording of the performance is available on Vimeo and an analysis of it is included in Yasmin Arshad's book Imagining Cleopatra: Performing Gender and Power in Early Modern England.

Daniel is a significant supporting character in the novel Imperfect Alchemist, by Naomi Miller, a fictionalized account of Mary Sidney.
