= John Danyel =

English lute player and songwriter (1564-c1626)

John Danyel or John Daniel (c. 1564 – c. 1626) was an English lute player and songwriter. He was born in Wellow, Somerset, and was the younger brother of poet Samuel Daniel. He was baptized on 6 November 1564. His surviving works include "Coy Daphne Fled", about the nymph Daphne and her fate, and "Like as the lute delights".

Sample lyrics from "Like as the lute delights":

Like as the lute delights, or else dislikes,
As is his art that plays upon the same;
So sounds my muse, according as she strikes
On my heart strings, high-tuned unto her fame.

Daniel held some offices at court, and was the author of Songs for the Lute, Viol and Voice (1606).

== Sources ==
- Sadie, S. (ed.) (1980) The New Grove Dictionary of Music & Musicians, [vol. no. 5].
