= Clan Scrymgeour =

Highland Scottish clan

- Crest: A Lion's Paw erased in bend Or holding a Crooked Sword or Scimitar Argent
- Motto: Dissipate (Disperse)

Profile
- Region: Highlands and east of Scotland
- District: Fife
- Plant badge: Rowan

Chief
- Alexander Scrymgeour
- The Rt. Hon. The 12th Earl of Dundee (Mac Mhic Iain)
- Seat: Birkhill north of Cupar in Fife
- Historic seat: Fincharn Castle; Dudhope Castle
Septs of Clan Scrymgeour
Scirmechour, Scrimgeour, Scrimger, Scrimiour, Scrymgeour, Scrymsour, Skrimagour, Skrimshire, Skymezour.

Clan Scrymgeour is a Highland Scottish clan.

== History ==
=== Origins of the clan ===
The name Scrymgeour is probably derived from skrymsher which is Old English for a swordsman. The Scrymgeour family was well established in Fife long before their connection with Dundee. The clan chiefs were later created constables, Earls of Dundee, and hereditary royal standard bearers.

Iain Moncreiffe stated that the Scrymgeours were probably descended from the MacDuff Earls of Fife. The Scrymgeours may have claimed their office as standard bearers from their early Celtic origins, as it was customary for Celtic armies to be accompanied by sacred holy relics that were borne by a hereditary keeper. It is therefore possible that the Scrymgeours carried a relic such as a staff of St. Columba which was later replaced by a heraldic banner.

=== Wars of Scottish Independence ===
During the Wars of Scottish Independence the Scrymgeours were confirmed as banner bearers by William Wallace and Parliament on 29 March 1298. Scrymgeour was named as Alexander, son of Colyn, son of Cairn and he was the first person to declare for Robert the Bruce. Scrymgeour obtained a charter from Bruce confirming the rights that had previously been granted to him by Wallace. This is the only surviving contemporary document where Bruce and Wallace are named together. However Sir Alexander Scrymgeour was later captured by the English and hanged at Newcastle upon the direct orders of Edward I of England in 1306. He was succeeded by another Alexander Scrymgeour who in 1314 rode as the royal banner bearer at the Battle of Bannockburn.

In 1370 large amounts of land in Argyll came to the Scrymgeour family when Alexander Scrymgeour married Agnes, heiress to Gilbert Glassary of that Ilk.

=== 15th and 16th centuries ===
In the 15th century the Clan Scrymgeour continued to prosper and the seventh constable of Dundee acquired the lands of Dudhope in 1495 that was near to the city. There they later built Dudhope Castle which was the chief's seat until 1668.

The Argyll estates were controlled from Fincharn Castle. John Scrymgeour of Glassary marched from Fincharn in 1513, as the royal banner bearer, to the Battle of Flodden where he received a mortal wound. The Scottish Gaelic name of Scrymgeour is Mac Mhic Iain and a local tradition is that Fincharn was burned down by an angry bridegroom when an early Mac Mhic Iain tried to steal his bride.

In 1587 Sir James Scrymgeour received a new charter to his estates at Holyrood House.

=== 17th century and Civil War ===
Sir James Scrymgeour (d.1612) was one of the commissioners sent to Denmark to negotiate the marriage of James VI of Scotland to Princess Anne of Denmark. He was also appointed as a commissioner to negotiate a political union with England in 1604.

In 1617 Sir James's successor, John Scrymgeour entertained James VI at Dudhope Castle. In 1641 he was raised to the peerage by King Charles I of England as Viscount of Dudhope and Baron Scrymgeour of Inverkeithing.

During the Civil War the second Viscount of Dudhope was sent with the Scottish Covenanter forces to assist the Parliament of England against Charles I. Scrymgeour received a fatal wound at the Battle of Marston Moor in July 1644. He was succeeded by his son, another John Scrymgeour, who commanded a regiment of royalist cavalry under the Duke of Hamilton in 1648 and fought at the Battle of Worcester in 1651. John escaped from the royal defeat and joined the army of General Middleton in the Scottish Highlands but was captured in 1654. After the Restoration of 1660, John Scremgeour was rewarded with the earldom of Dundee.

=== Disputed chiefship ===
John Scrymgeour died in 1668 without issue and his castles, estates and royal offices were seized upon a legal pretext by the Duke of Lauderdale. The Duke had sent soldiers to carry off all of the Scrymgeour's papers and charters and then declared that there was no lawful heir and the estates were reverted to the Crown. The Duke then gained from the king a grant to the titles and estates that he then gave to his own brother, Lord Chattan. The estates later passed to John Graham, 1st Viscount Dundee who was killed at the Battle of Killiecrankie in 1689. The estates were then forfeited and passed to the Douglases.

Upon the death of the earl, the estates should have gone to John Scrymgeour of Kirkton who was the great-grandson of the fifth constable of Dundee. Scrymgeour of Kirkton's grandson was David Scrymgeour, sheriff of Inverness who married Catherine, daughter of Alexander Wedderburn of Wedderburn. Their son assumed the surname Scrymgeour-Wedderburn and succeeded to the Wedderburn estates. However the Wedderburns continued to assert their right to the ancient titles and honours of their Scrymgeour ancestors. At the coronation of Edward VII, Henry Scrymgeour-Wedderburn carried the standard of Scotland. His grandson, another Henry Scrymgeour-Wedderburn was recognized as eleventh Earl of Dundee by the House of Lords. The eleventh earl's son is Alexander Scrymgeour, 12th Earl of Dundee, the present chief of Clan Scrymgeour.

== Clan Chief ==
The current chief of Clan Scrymgeour is Alexander Scrymgeour, 12th Earl of Dundee who has followed his father into politics in the House of Lords.

== Clan Seat ==
The Scrymgeour family seat is still at Birkhill north of Cupar in Fife.

== Archives ==
The archives of the Scrimgeour Clan Association are held by the University of Dundee.

== See also ==
- Earl of Dundee
- Scottish clan
