= Patricia Scrymgeour-Wedderburn, Countess of Dundee =

Countess of Dundee (1910–2012)

The Right Honourable The Countess of Dundee

Personal details
- Born: Patricia Katherine Montagu Douglas Scott; 9 October 1910 Hertfordshire, London, England
- Died: 3 December 2012 (aged 102)
- Spouses: Walter Douglas Faulkner MC (m. 1930, died 1940); David Scrymgeour-Wedderburn (m. 1940, died 1944); Henry Scrymgeour-Wedderburn, 11th Earl of Dundee (m. 1946, died 1983)
- Children: David James Faulkner; Hermione Moncreiffe; Janet Fox-Pitt; Elizabeth Roper-Curzon, Dowager Lady Teynham; Alexander Scrymgeour-Wedderburn, 12th Earl of Dundee
- Parents: Lord Herbert Montagu Douglas Scott (father); Marie Josephine Edwards (mother)

Patricia Katherine Scrymgeour-Wedderburn, Countess of Dundee (née Montagu Douglas Scott, formerly Faulkner, 9 October 1910 - 3 December 2012) was the Countess of Dundee and the daughter of Lord Herbert Montagu Douglas Scott who was son of William Montagu Douglas Scott, 6th Duke of Buccleuch.

She was paternal grandaunt of Sarah Ferguson, former wife of Andrew Mountbatten-Windsor, second son of Queen Elizabeth II, making her great-grandaunt of Princess Beatrice and Princess Eugenie. She was also first cousin of Princess Alice, Duchess of Gloucester, wife of Prince Henry, Duke of Gloucester, brother of Kings Edward VIII and George VI and uncle of Queen Elizabeth II.

Patricia was married three times. She first married Walter Douglas Faulkner MC on 8 July 1930, in England. Then she was widowed, and married David Scrymgeour-Wedderburn on 9 September 1940. Then she was widowed again, and married her brother-in-law Henry James Scrymgeour, which took place on 30 October 1946 in London, England. Patricia had a total of six children by three fathers. Her son Alexander is the Earl of Dundee and her daughter Elizabeth is now the Dowager Lady Teynham.

The Dowager Countess of Dundee died on 3 December 2012, in her home Birkhill Castle, Scotland, aged 102.
