= John Scrimgeour =

John Scrimgeour or Scrymgeour may refer to:

- John Scrimgeour (minister), Scottish Presbyterian minister
- John Scrimgeour of Myres, Scottish architect
- John Scrimgeour (Canadian politician), Scottish-born farmer and political figure in Prince Edward Island
- John Scrymgeour, 1st Earl of Dundee, Scottish soldier
- John Scrymgeour, 1st Viscount of Dudhope, Scottish politician
