= Jane Drummond, Countess of Roxburghe =

Scottish courtier

Jane Drummond, Countess of Roxburghe (c.1585–1643) was a Scottish courtier, a member of the household of Anne of Denmark in Scotland and England.

== Courtier and Governess ==
Jean or Jane Drummond was the daughter of Patrick Drummond, 3rd Lord Drummond and his first wife, Elizabeth Lindsay. Historians use either first name, recent writers prefer "Jane".

Drummond was a gentlewoman in the household of Anne of Denmark, described as her "familiar servitrix", and had care over the infant Prince Charles at Dunfermline Palace in 1602. The Prince, known as "Duke Charles", was slow to learn to walk and an oak stool with wheels to help train him was delivered to Jane Drummond, described in the Scots language as a "tymber stule with rynand quheillis to gang in".

In 1603, on the accession of James VI of Scotland to the throne of England (as James I), Anne of Denmark went to Stirling Castle to take custody of her son, Prince Henry, in order to take him to London. Drummond was with Anne of Denmark at Stirling Castle on 10 May 1603 when she quarrelled with the Master of Mar and Marie Stewart, Countess of Mar over the custody of Prince Henry and had a miscarriage.

== England ==
Drummond bought linen for the Queen's costume and lace for her ruffs in England. The court travelled to Winchester in September 1603 to avoid the plague in London, and the queen ordered fabrics for new clothes for Drummond and other women who had made the journey from Scotland, including Anne Livingstone, Margaret Stewart, and Margaret Hartsyde. Drummond took delivery of materials provided by the silkwoman, Hester le Telier. In the years before her marriage, Anna of Denmark also gave Drummond gifts of her old clothes.

In November 1603 the Spanish ambassador, the Count of Villamediana, invited the Duke of Lennox and the Earl of Mar to dinner. According to Arbella Stuart, he asked them "to bring the Scottish ladies for he was desirous to see some natural beauties." These included "my Cousin Drummond" and Anna Hay with Elizabeth Carey, and they were given presents of gold chains and Spanish leather gloves.

Jane Drummond and Anna Hay, later Countess of Winton, as important members of the queen's household were allocated two footmen to attend them, Andrew Robinson and George Baron. Robinson was later replaced by Andrew Drummond, probably a relation of Jean.

The Privy Council suggested economies in the royal households by reducing the amount of food allowed in October 1605. Food allowances were assigned to individual members of the household in "messes" and "dishes". Jean Drummond's allowance was a "diet of 7 dishes" and this might be reduced to a "chamber mess of two" which the other ladies at court received. Evidently Drummond enjoyed special favour and had a number of servants and followers.

Ottaviano Lotti, a diplomat from Florence, wrote to John Florio (a groom of Anne of Denmark's household) for help to buy hunting dogs to present to Anne of Denmark, in the mean time keeping the gift a secret from Jean Drummond. In 1607, a marriage between Drummond and Archibald Campbell, 7th Earl of Argyll was discussed. She corresponded with her cousin Duncan Campbell of Glenorchy about the proposals, expressing some reluctance to be the earl's second wife, "I do not esteem the place of a second wife so much, his estate being as it is". The plans were abandoned.

=== The Masque of Beauty and the Italian poet ===
Jane Drummond was involved in The Masque of Beauty, performed in January 1608. An Italian poet in London, Antimo Galli wrote verses about the event, mentioning her, and also published a sonnet in her praise, in the style of Torquato Tasso. He calls her "Giovanna". The imagery celebrates Drummond's friendship with the queen and may reflect a motto used by Anne of Denmark, La Mia Grandezza Dal Eccelso, my greatness comes from on high. Translated by Jamie Reid-Baxter, the sonnet reads:

The prudence and the courage which reign
In you, Jean, are such, that observers are left
Both astonished, reverent and enamoured:
Since you are a woman whose soul is worthy
Only of heaven, and such that it does not disdain,
O great Lady, to open up the great secrets of the heart:
And hence, now that its splendour has made
Clear your lovely thoughts, you teach us to rely on God.
Neither Artemisia, nor Zenobia, or any other
More celebrated Lady, present or past,
Has ever possessed so many graces.
O Friend of heroic virtue and of glory,
Having set all worldly pleasures at naught,
You make heaven enamoured of your lovely soul.

=== Gatekeeping the Queen's favour ===
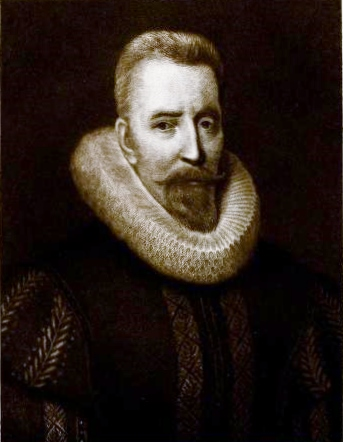
Drummond joked with Thomas Hamilton about his silver mine and new born daughter

Drummond held a position of responsibility in the queen's household, and wrote and signed financial documents, including on 24 July 1609 a warrant to Thomas Knyvet to pay £500 to the queen's jeweller George Heriot, and in 1612 a warrant for lifetime payments to the queen's four French musicians, the lutenists; Louis Richart, Camille Prevost, Claude Olivier, and Peter de la Mere.

As a close companion of the queen, Jane Drummond was able to intercede with her for the benefit of others. Arbella Stuart wrote to her with thanks for the queen's favour and the hearing of her suit, which Drummond had presented to the queen in a good light. Arbella hoped that Jane would move the queen to ensure the king would "weigh my cause aright". Drummond wrote to Arbella that Anna of Denmark had passed her petition to King James. He gave no answer except to say that Arbella "had eaten of the forbidden tree." Arbella Stuart sent Drummond, who was Mistress of the Robes, gloves which she had embroidered herself, to be given to the queen. Anne of Denmark sent Arbella a gift, intended according to Drummond, to witness the continuance of her favour. Drummond signed her letters to Arbella as "Jane Drumond"

Jane Drummond was the sister-in-law of Alexander Seton, 1st Earl of Dunfermline, who was Lord Chancellor of Scotland and administrator of Anne's Scottish dowry lands. She was therefore a conduit of influence between Anne of Denmark and Scottish politics. In August 1608, Seton had to defend himself from rumours that he corresponded with Anne of Denmark without the King's knowledge.

Jane Drummond wrote to the King's Advocate in Scotland Thomas Hamilton in May 1608, mentioning that she had told the queen that King James had compensated him for his silver mine at Hilderston. She congratulated him on this windfall payment and on the birth of a daughter. She had discussed whether Anne of Denmark would be a godparent, and Anne had said not. Hamilton's daughter was christened Anna, after the queen. Drummond wrote;

"I acquentit hir Maiesti with your gud luk; for the king no shuner gaive you mony for your mynd, bot God send you a chyld to bestow it on. Hir Maiesti was wel contentit that you gaive your dochter that neme, bot says sho wil not allow hir for hir goddochtir becaus you did not aduertis hir, that sho micht have don to you as sho had don to uthers"

(modernised) I acquainted her Majesty with your good luck; for the king no sooner gave you money for your mine, but God send you a child to bestow it on. Her Majesty was well contented that you gave your daughter that name, but says she will not allow her for her god daughter because you did not advertise her, that she might have done to you as she had done to others.

She also wrote to Hamilton about the queen's business and the case of the queen's servant Margaret Hartsyde who was on trial in Edinburgh for stealing the queen's jewels. Anne of Denmark wished that Hartsyde would be found guilty and treated severely.

=== Interceding for Lord Balmerino ===
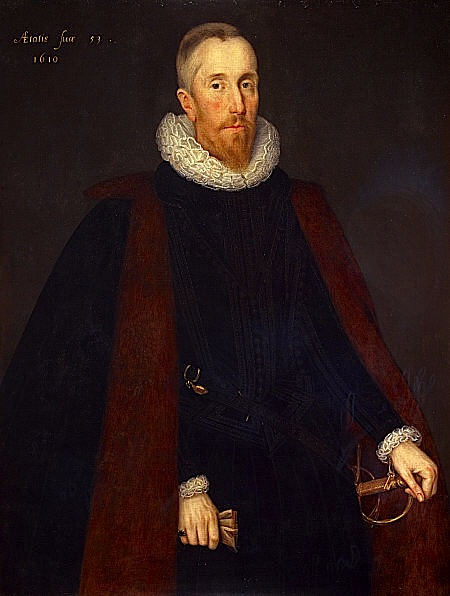
James VI realised that Drummond would be a better friend to Alexander Seton than to Lord Balmerino

Lord Balmerino got in trouble for historic charges of involving the king in correspondence with Robert Bellarmine. In December 1608 Balmerino believed that Drummond was acting in his favour. As Drummond was encouraging Anne of Denmark to speak up for Balmerino, James VI intervened by getting Drummond to understand she would be putting her friend and relative Alexander Seton, Chancellor of Scotland to a disadvantage. Balmerino was found guilty of treason in March 1609 and sentenced to be beheaded, quartered, and demeaned as a traitor. The sentence was not carried out, due to the intercession of Anne of Denmark at the instance of Jane Drummond. Balmerino wrote to "Lady Jane" and to David Abercromby to obtain the Queen's "accustomed care" and the help of the Earl of Dunbar, and composed some instructions for his agent's discussions with Jean and the Queen. Balmerino, who was imprisoned for a time at Falkland Palace, was eventually released.

=== Sickness in the queen's household ===
In June 1609 Drummond and Lady Fleetwood stayed at the bedside of her kinsman and servant of the queen, David Abercromby, who had helped intercede for Lord Balmerino, and was now dying. He declared his will to them. Abercromby's role in the household had involved dealing with the goldsmith George Heriot for the queen's jewels.

Cecily Bulstrode and Bridget Markham, two of the queen's ladies in waiting, also died in the summer of 1609. In October the Queen's groom of the robes died of plague. At the end of November 1610 one of Drummond's maids died from the plague in her lodgings at Greenwich Palace and the queen returned to Whitehall for fear of infection. Soon after the surveyor of royal buildings Simon Basil was asked to demolish "Mrs Drummond's lodgings".

=== Drummond and Spain ===
Spanish diplomats also saw Jane Drummond as a route to influence the queen, and she was recommended by the ambassador Juan de Tassis, 1st Count of Villamediana and received a Spanish pension.

Tassis and the Constable of Castile gave her an aigrette studded with 75 diamonds in 1604, made in Brussels by Jean Guiset. The Constable was hesitant about awarding a pension to a woman. In 1611 the Spanish ambassador Alonso de Velasco wrote that a Catholic priest was concealed at the court of Anne of Denmark, posing as Drummond's servant. On 29 July 1612, a Spanish diplomat, the Marquis de Flores spoke with her at Somerset House after his audience with the queen. Drummond pressed him for further information, suggesting that he planned to continue negotiations about the marriage of Princess Elizabeth.

Her pension of 3000 felipes or 1,500 ducats was usually paid in July. Spanish diplomats referred to her and her pension by an alias or codename, possibly using Rugero, and later Florían and Oriana.

In 1615, the English ambassador in Madrid, John Digby, made inquiries about the rewards she received, and reported to King James, "in the list for a distribution of the Spanish ambassador in England, his ordinary allowance a thousand five hundred crowns, ordained to be bestowed upon occasions in presents and New Year's gift upon Lady Jane Drummond. But I am bound withal in conscience to let your Majesty understand that in all the advertisements that have come to my hands, I cannot perceive that she ever received any thing, but only a slight jewel or two, and a basin and ewer of some rich stone given by the Spanish ambassador in England, as I conceive at her marriage. Neither in all the letters and dispatches of the Spanish ambassador in England which I can find, any one thing to her prejudice".

=== Friendship, tranquility, and pictures ===
When the Italian designer Costantino de' Servi was sent from Florence to serve Henry Frederick, Prince of Wales, he gained an audience with Anne of Denmark and offered to paint her portrait and the portrait of Jane Drummond. In November 1611, Drummond compared the queen's reputation to be content among "hermites pictures in a paltry gallery" with the Earl of Salisbury's "great employments in fair rooms". Her remark draws attention to Anne of Denmark's collection, and contrasts the smaller and more private spaces housing the queen's pictures with the halls and presence chambers where public statecraft was enacted.

With other members of the queen's household, Drummond was given mourning clothes on the death of Prince Henry in 1612. In 1612 and 1613 Drummond was involved in the affairs of her friend Anne Livingstone, who was trying to have her husband Alexander Seton of Foulstruther recognised as Earl of Eglinton. Livingstone offered to send her gifts of linen and aquavitae. Drummond wrote to Anne Livingstone of developments during the queen's progress to Bath following the wedding of Princess Elizabeth and Frederick V of the Palatinate. She successfully persuaded the queen to intercede with King James in her friend's favour.

== Countess of Roxburghe ==
She married Robert Ker, 1st Lord Roxburghe (later created Earl of Roxburghe), on 3 February 1614. According to Scottish custom, women did not use their husband's surnames.

Anne of Denmark's chamberlain, Viscount Lisle, sent John Finet to invite the French ambassador Antoine Lefèvre de la Boderie. The wedding was celebrated at Somerset House and attended by the king and queen. There was a masque Hymen's Triumph written by Samuel Daniel. John Chamberlain had heard that the queen would pay for the festivities and a "Masque of Maids, if they may be found", but no more than £500 for a wedding-gown and a marriage bed because "her maid Drummond is rich enough otherwise, as well in wealth as in virtue and favour."

The wedding feast and Daniel's masque was said to have cost the queen £3000, and it was an opportunity for her to show off the recent refurbishment of Somerset House. The Queen's ushers, Zachary Bethell and John Tunstall prepared spaces for the entertainments. The masque and its setting in a courtyard of the palace on the Strand was described by the ambassador of Savoy, Giovanni Battista Gabaleone.

There was a reception with a play on the day after for the Lord Mayor of London, Thomas Myddleton and the aldermen. There was another celebratory feast on 16 February. The Earl of Rutland gave a wedding present of a gilt bowl and cover and a pair of candlesticks worth £61. There were banquets hosted by the queen for those who gave presents, one for men and one for women. According to the Earl of Shrewsbury, King James planned to officially rename Somerset House as Denmark House at the wedding, John Chamberlain also mentioned a name change to the "Queen's Court".

After her marriage she continued to sign letters as "Jane Drummond". She would not have styled herself "Jean Ker". In early modern Scotland married women did not usually adopt their husband's surnames.

Anne of Denmark had a version of her portrait at Oatlands. Mary Seton, the former maid of Mary, Queen of Scots, wrote to her in September 1614. Alexander Seton, 1st Earl of Dunfermline, wrote to her to 1614, asking John Murray to deliver the letter to "my Lady Roxbrough, my sister".

She was with the queen during her illness at Greenwich Palace in May 1615. She wrote to her husband on 10 May 1615 that he was to thank the king for the letter, and that the physician Theodore de Mayerne was writing to the king with details of the queen's sickness. Anne's foot was swollen and she had been sitting a chair all day long.

In July 1615 she was bought a white gelding horse for £16-10s in place of her old grey horse which was blind and lame. In March 1616 King James gave her £3000 in recognition of her long service to the queen. In January 1617 she was godmother to Elizabeth Gordon, daughter of Sir Robert Gordon of Gordonstoun and Louisa Gordon whose mother Geneviève Petau de Maulette is said to have taught French to Elizabeth of Bohemia. The other godparents were the Earl of Hertford and Lucy Russell, Countess of Bedford.

=== Dismissed ===
In 1617, Queen Anne forced the countess to retire from court after it was discovered that her husband sought to be appointed Lord Chamberlain to Prince Charles (later Charles I), without either of them informing the queen. One newsletter said that she had lost her place as "groom of the stole" to a daughter of the Countess of Shrewsbury, Elizabeth Grey, Countess of Kent, (Lady Ruthin). Another writer thought that, "the Lady of Ruthen, the Lady Walsingham, and Mrs Southwell" were in competition to succeed her, but a daughter of the Lord Montacute, Mary Browne, might be favoured.

On 10 May 1617 Drummond signed a receipt as "Jane Roxbrough", for a £500 installment of the king's gift of £3,000 to her "in consideration of long and faithful service done to the Queen, as one of the ladies of the bedchamber to her Majesty." In July, Dudley Carleton wanted to give Anne of Denmark a clock. His agents contacted John Bennett, chancellor of the queen's jointure lands to arrange a meeting with Lady Roxburghe, but then delivered the gift to Roxburghe at Nonsuch Palace without making a formal presentation.

Lord Roxburghe came to the queen's household at Oatlands in August 1617 and she left the court. Her dismissal particularly alarmed the ambassadors of Spain and Venice, who had relied on the Catholic countess as a confidante to the queen. As predicted, the Countess of Kent, Lady Grey of Ruthin, succeeded to her place.

Lady Anne Clifford mentions that Drummond was pregnant and travelled to Scotland in a litter. Lucy, Countess of Bedford, was upset that her friend had returned to Scotland, and in October 1617 wrote to Lady Cornwallis that Roxburghe's absence in Scotland "makes me perfectly hate the court". Anne of Denmark frowned and "looked big" at Roxburghe's allies.

== In Scotland ==
An account of her and her husband's expenses from 1619 to 1630 runs to 550 pages, and mentions her residence at East Roxburgh, a townhouse in Edinburgh's Canongate, and Broxmouth near Dunbar.

She gave clothes to her friend Margaret Seton, Lady Dudhope, a daughter of David Seton of Parbroath, and visited her at Dudhope in Dundee. Her husband John Scrimgeour, Constable of Dundee ordered a pair of pistols for Lord Roxburghe from a gunsmith in Dundee and the countess gave him a tip of £3, known as "drinksilver". Her step-daughter Isobel Ker was married to Margaret Seton's son, James Scrimgeour, later 2nd Viscount Dudhope.

The household book records spices and food seasonings such as cinnamon, mace, ginger, and sugar almonds bought in Edinburgh and sent to East Roxburgh, as were materials and ribbons for clothing. She bought textiles for clothes for herself, her husband, her nieces and nephews, and servants. On 21 July 1619 she gave six shillings to a boy walking on stilts on Soutra Hill who said he was going all the way to London.

In a letter of May 1622 she mentions her fear of sailing across the River Forth from Leith, which she had never done before, to attend a christening in Fife. However, an earlier journey to Dudhope Castle in 1619 involving crossing the Forth is detailed in the account book. In July 1623 she travelled with the Viscount Lauderdale to Drummond Castle in Strathearn to stay for a month with her brother John Drummond, 2nd Earl of Perth.

== Royal Governess Again ==
In 1630, the by-now Charles I had wished to appoint the countess as governess to his son, the Prince of Wales (later Charles II) but this was objected to on the grounds of her religion and the Countess of Dorset was appointed instead. A year later however, Lady Roxburghe was appointed governess to Princess Mary and later to Prince Henry and Princess Elizabeth in 1641.

In 1642, the countess accompanied Princess Mary to The Hague after the latter's marriage to Prince William of Orange. On the voyage back from the Netherlands a ship of the royal fleet sank in bad weather. According to a 2016 article from The Guardian, a silk dress belonging to the countess was discovered in 2014 in the wreck off the Dutch island of Texel. However, this hypothesis has since been rejected.

On her return to England, the countess was replaced as the governess to Mary Princess Royal by Lady Stanhope. She resumed her governess-ship to Henry and Elizabeth in 1642, and hosted Lilias Drummond, a daughter of the Earl of Perth, at her house in London, who married James Murray, 2nd Earl of Tullibardine in May 1643. The older sister of Lilias, also Jean Drummond, and later Countess of Wigtown, was a nurse to royal children, as was another Jean Drummond, the widow of Secretary Murray and mother of Anne, Lady Halkett.

She died on 7 October 1643 and was buried in Holyrood Abbey.

Her husband's 1650 will mentions a chain of diamonds and rubies, with a "picture case" or locket containing the miniature portrait of Anne of Denmark, set with diamonds, the central larger stone was heart shaped. He owned a "valentine set with diamonds" with a crown and the picture of Charles I of England as Duke of York. These jewels had probably been gifts to his wife from the queen, supplied by George Heriot.

== Family ==
Her first son died in 1616. A daughter was christened at Greenwich in April 1616, Anna of Denmark and Lucy, Countess of Bedford were godparents.

Her son Henry Kerr married Margaret Hay, a daughter of the Earl of Erroll. Henry Kerr joined the supporters of the Scottish covenant who opposed the king. On 20 May 1639, Jean Roxburghe wrote from Whitehall to Walter Balcanquhall, Dean of Durham, expressing her disappointment over this defection. Henry Kerr died in 1643, leaving three or four daughters including, Jean, Margaret, and Sophia (born after his death). His widow, Margaret Hay married the Earl of Cassilis.
