= Bearer of the National Flag of Scotland =

The Saltire

The Bearer of the National Flag of Scotland is one of the Great Officers in the Royal Household of Scotland. The bearer participates in royal, state, or other ceremonial events when needed.

By charter of novodamus of 1676, later ratified by the Parliament of Scotland, Charles II granted Charles Maitland "the office of bearing our insignia within our said realm of Scotland". Maitland's descendant, James Maitland, 8th Earl of Lauderdale, matriculated arms in the character of Hereditary Standard Bearer of Scotland.

In 1952, the Lord Lyon decided that the Earl of Lauderdale's right was to bear the Saltire, whereas the Earl of Dundee as Bearer of the Royal Banner bears the Royal Banner of Scotland, the "Lion Rampant".

== Sources ==
Stair Memorial Encyclopedia of the Laws of Scotland, Vol 7, para 826
