= Alexander Scrymgeour, 12th Earl of Dundee =

Scottish peer (born 1949)

The Right Honourable The Earl of Dundee DL
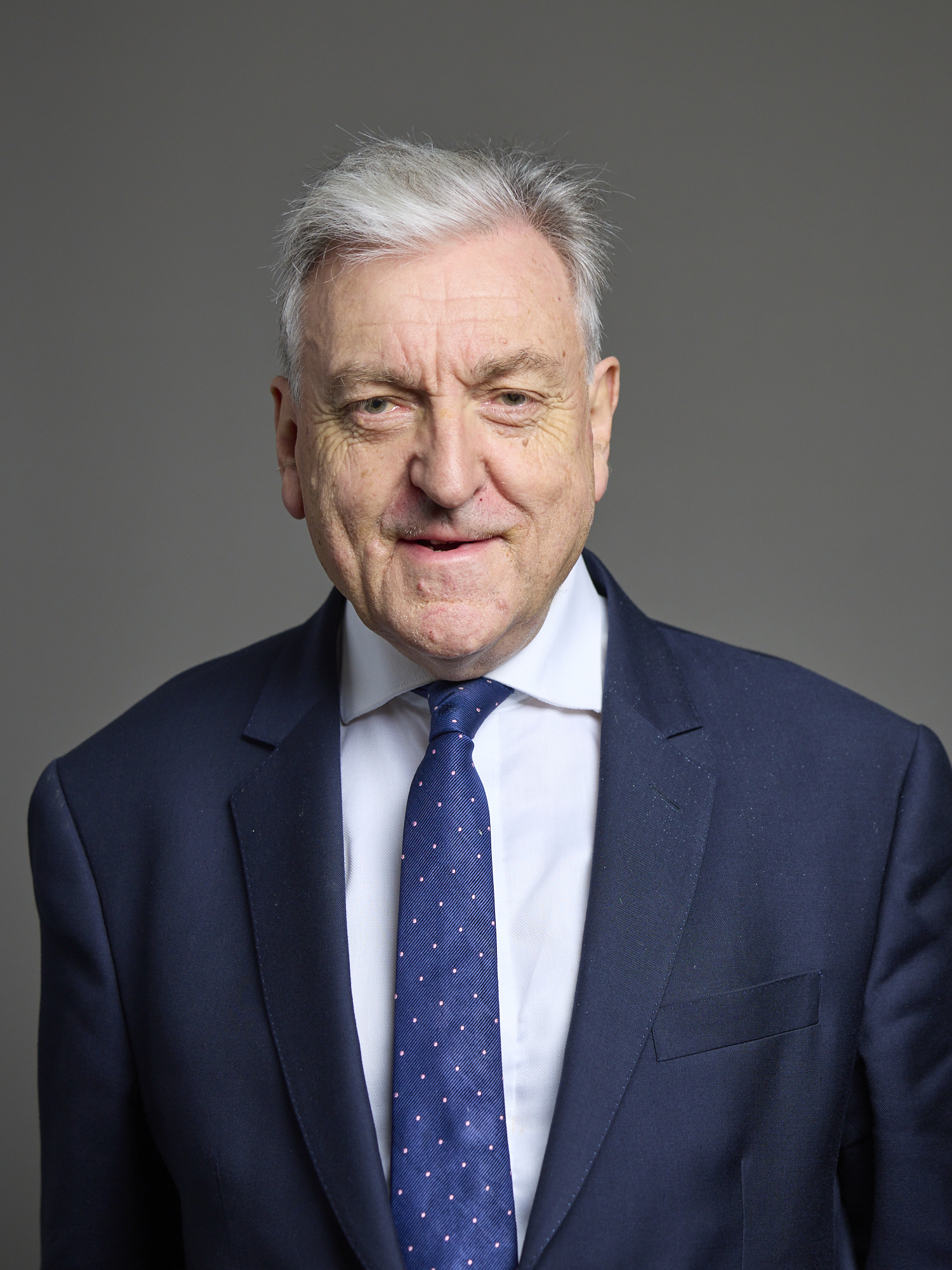
- Official portrait, 2025

Member of the House of Lords
- Lord Temporal
- Hereditary peerage 28 October 1983 – 11 November 1999
- Preceded by: The 11th Earl of Dundee
- Succeeded by: Seat abolished
- Elected Hereditary Peer; 11 November 1999 – 29 April 2026
- Election: 1999
- Preceded by: Seat established
- Succeeded by: Seat abolished

Lord-in-waiting Government Whip
- In office 3 October 1986 – 26 July 1989
- Prime Minister: Margaret Thatcher
- Preceded by: new appointment
- Succeeded by: The Lord Reay

Personal details
- Born: 5 June 1949 (age 77)
- Party: Conservative
- Spouse: Siobhan Mary Llewellyn (m. 1979; died 2019) J. H. Trotter (m. 2026)
- Children: 4
- Parent(s): Henry Scrymgeour-Wedderburn, 11th Earl of Dundee; Patricia Katherine Montagu Douglas Scott

Alexander Henry Scrymgeour, 12th Earl of Dundee, DL (born 5 June 1949), is a Scottish peer, Conservative politician and Chief of the Clan Scrymgeour.

Born on 5 June 1949, Dundee is the son of Henry Scrymgeour-Wedderburn, 11th Earl of Dundee, and Patricia Montagu Douglas Scott. He was educated at Ludgrove School and Eton College before attending the University of St Andrews. He was a Page of Honour to Queen Elizabeth II.

Lord Scrymgeour's first active experience as a Conservative politician was as the party's candidate in the Hamilton by-election in 1978. He has sat in the House of Lords since his father's death in 1983, and served as a Lord-in-waiting (Conservative Party whip in the House of Lords) from 1986 to 1989. He served as Government Spokesperson for Education (1986–1988), Government Spokesperson for Scottish Affairs (1986–1989), Government Spokesperson for Home Affairs and for Energy (1987–1989). He was made an elected hereditary peer (as Earl of Dundee) in 1999.

He has served as the UK delegate to the Organization for Security and Co-operation in Europe from 1992 to 1997. He was also a member of the Parliamentary Assembly of the Council of Europe and the Western European parliament from 1992 to 1999. The Earl is honorary consul for Croatia in Edinburgh, and is decorated with the Order of Prince Branimir. The Dundee Trust works on the Dalmatian coast in Croatia on behalf of DFID to distribute humanitarian aid to some of the poorest people in the Balkans.

A farmer of thirty years' experience, Lord Dundee's Farming Company manages some 2,000 acres over the counties of Fife and Angus. Dundee has sat in the House since 1983 where he has exercised his privileges on a number of agriculture and environmental standing committees. Most recently his interests have turned to health questions.

Lord Dundee is also the Hereditary Royal Standard Bearer of Scotland, Constable of Dundee, and Chief of the Name and Arms of Scrymgeour. He was one of the peers carrying the Royal Standards at the 2023 coronation.

He is a member of the New Club, Edinburgh and Whites, in London.

== Family ==
Lord Dundee married Siobhan Mary (died 11 March 2019), daughter of David Llewellyn of 41 Cleveland Square, London, and Great Somerford, Wiltshire, on 19 July 1979. They have four children:

- Lady Marina Patricia Scrymgeour (born 21 August 1980)
- Henry David Scrymgeour-Wedderburn, Viscount Dudhope (born 20 June 1982)
- Lady Flora Hermione Vera Scrymgeour (born 3 November 1985)
- Lady Lavinia Rebecca Elizabeth Scrymgeour (born 1986).

On 17 January 2026 he married J. H. Trotter at St Philip's Church, Kensington.

Court offices
Preceded by Earl of Lewes	Page of Honour; 1964–1965	Succeeded by Douglas Gordon
Political offices
Preceded by The Viscount Davidson	Lord-in-waiting; 1986–1989	Succeeded by The Viscount Ullswater
Peerage of Scotland
Preceded by Henry Scrymgeour-Wedderburn	Earl of Dundee; 1983–present Member of the House of Lords (1983–1999)	Incumbent; Heir apparent: Henry Scrymgeour-Wedderburn, Viscount Dudhope
Parliament of the United Kingdom
New office created by the House of Lords Act 1999	Elected hereditary peer to the House of Lords under the House of Lords Act 1999; 1999–2026	Office abolished under the House of Lords (Hereditary Peers) Act 2026
