= Earl of Dundee =

Aristocratic title in the Peerage of Scotland

Earldom of Dundee
- Creation date: 1660
- Created by: Charles II
- Peerage: Peerage of Scotland
- First holder: John Scrymgeour, 3rd Viscount Dudhope
- Present holder: Alexander Scrymgeour, 12th Earl of Dundee
- Heir apparent: Henry David Scrymgeour-Wedderburn of that Ilk, Lord Scrymgeour
- Subsidiary titles: Viscount of Dudhope; Baron Glassary of Glassary, Argyll; Lord Scrymgeour; Lord Innerkeithing
- Status: extant
- Seat: Birkhill
- Former seat: Dudhope Castle

Earl of Dundee is a title in the Peerage of Scotland. It was created in 1660 for John Scrymgeour, 3rd Viscount Dudhope. At his death in 1668, the Duke of Lauderdale declared that the first Earl had no heirs-male, and had the crown seize all of his lands. The earldom of Dundee became dormant and its holdings and offices were granted to Charles Maitland, 3rd Earl of Lauderdale, the Duke's younger brother. The title was revived in 1953, when it was determined that the first Earl did indeed have heirs-male, contrary to the assertion of the crown. The title was given to Henry James Scrymgeour-Wedderburn, who had previously served in the House of Commons and in the Cabinet.

The Earl of Dundee holds the subsidiary titles: Viscount of Dudhope and Lord Scrymgeour, both created 1641 during the Bishops' Wars, when King Charles I was visiting Edinburgh. On the Restoration of Charles II, Lord Dundee received the additional title Lord Innerkeithing (created 1660). In 1954, the 11th Earl was created Baron Glassary of Glassary, Argyll. The first three titles are in the Peerage of Scotland and the Barony of Glassary is in the Peerage of the United Kingdom.

The eldest son and heir of the earl is addressed by a courtesy title as Lord Scrymgeour.

The family seat is Birkhill Castle near Cupar, Fife.

== History ==
In 1107 Sir Alexander Carron, nicknamed Schyrmeschur ("The Swordsman") for his deeds against the northern rebels, was granted the arms and name of Schyrmeschur by King Alexander I. He was also granted the office of Hereditary Royal Standard-Bearer of Scotland. This gave him the right to bear the Royal Banner in front of the monarch in procession or before the Army of Scotland in times of war. In 1298 Sir Alexander Schyrmeschur was awarded the office of Constable of Dundee.

== Royal Standard Bearer of Scotland (1107) ==
In 1107 Sir Alexander Schyrmeschur was given the hereditary honor of carrying the Royal Standard. In 1676, Charles II granted Charles Maitland, Lord Haltoun "the office of bearing our insignia within our said realm of Scotland" by a charter of novodamus. After Lauderdale's death in 1691, the office of Standard-Bearer was not claimed by anyone until 1820, when Henry Scrymgeour-Wedderburn claimed the right to act as such an officer at the coronation of George IV. The Privy Council did not grant Scrymgeour-Wedderburn the authority to appear at the coronation (which was granted to the 8th Earl of Lauderdale). However, it did confirm his possession of the office of Standard-Bearer (which he exercised at Holyrood House in 1822). This was successfully confirmed by Henry Scrymgeour, de jure 10th Earl of Dundee, in 1902. In 1952, the Lord Lyon advised that the Earl of Lauderdale's right was to bear the saltire as the Bearer of the National Flag of Scotland, whereas the Earl of Dundee bears the lion rampant as the Hereditary Royal Standard Bearer for Scotland he has administered at all recent coronations.

== Constable of Dundee (1298, 1324) ==
Sir Alexander Schyrmeschur, Hereditary Royal Standard Bearer, served as Standard Bearer for the army of Sir William Wallace, the Guardian of the Kingdom of Scotland. As a reward for his gallant service he was granted the title of Constable of Dundee Castle as well as a grant of the nearby manor of Upper Dudhope. This title was originally granted as a lifetime honor but it was made hereditary by a Royal Charter granted by Robert I to his son Nicolas in 1324. It was declared dormant upon the death of John Scrymgeour, 1st Earl of Dundee and 13th Constable of Dundee, in 1668.

- Sir Alexander Schyrmeschur, the first Constable of Dundee (d. 1306)
- Sir Nicolas Scrymseor, 2nd Constable of Dundee (d. 1324)
- Sir John Scrymseor, 3rd Constable of Dundee (d. 1332)
- Sir Alexander Scrymseor, 4th Constable of Dundee (d. 1383)
- Sir James Scrymseor, 5th Constable of Dundee (d. 1411)
- Sir John Scrymseor, 6th Constable of Dundee (d. 1465)
- Sir James Scrymseour, 7th Constable of Dundee (d. 1478)
- Sir James Scrimgeour of Dudhope, 8th Constable of Dundee (d. 1504)
- Sir James Scrymseor, 9th Constable of Dundee (d. 1546)
- Sir James Scrimgeour, 10th Constable of Dundee (d. 1612)
- Sir John Scrymgeour, 11th Constable (d. 7 March 1643) (created Viscount of Dudhope in 1641)

== Viscounts of Dudhope (1641) ==
- John Scrymgeour, 1st Viscount of Dudhope (d. 1643)
- James Scrymgeour, 2nd Viscount of Dudhope (d. 1644)
- John Scrymgeour, 3rd Viscount of Dudhope later 1st Earl of Dundee (d. 1668) (created Earl of Dundee in 1660; dormant 1668)

== Earls of Dundee (1660) ==
In the following list of the Earls of Dundee, the earls who claimed the title de jure (legally), but in fact did not hold it de facto (actually), are included.

- John Scrymgeour, 1st Earl of Dundee (d. 1668) (dormant 1668)
- John Scrymgeour of Kirkton, de jure 2nd Earl of Dundee (1628–1698)
- James Scrymgeour, de jure 3rd Earl of Dundee (1664–1699)
- Dr. Alexander Scrymgeour, de jure 4th Earl of Dundee (1669–1739)
- David Scrymgeour of Birkhill, de jure 5th Earl of Dundee (1702–1772)
- Alexander Scrymgeour-Wedderburn, de jure 6th Earl of Dundee (1742–1811)
- Henry Scrymgeour-Wedderburn, de jure 7th Earl of Dundee (1755–1841)
- Frederick Lewis Scrymgeour-Wedderburn, de jure 8th Earl of Dundee (1808–1874)
- Henry Scrymgeour-Wedderburn, de jure 9th Earl of Dundee (1840–1914)
- Henry Scrymgeour-Wedderburn, de jure 10th Earl of Dundee (1872–1924)
- Henry James Scrymgeour-Wedderburn, 11th Earl of Dundee (1902–1983) (revived 1953)
- Alexander Henry Scrymgeour, 12th Earl of Dundee (born 1949)

The heir apparent is the present holder's son, Henry David Scrymgeour-Wedderburn of that Ilk, Lord Scrymgeour (b. 1982).
The heir apparent's heir apparent is his son, Hon. Tassilo Alexander Robert Scrymgeour-Wedderburn, Master of Scrymgeour (b. 2005).

== Jacobite creation ==
John Graham was created Viscount Dundee by James II and VII in 1688 and was instrumental in the First Jacobite Rising. Viscount Dundee died in the Battle of Killiecrankie in 1689.

Shortly before 12 November 1705, John Baptist/Giovanni Battista Gualterio, brother of Cardinal Filippo Antonio Gualterio, Cardinal Protector of Scotland, as of 1706, and England, as of 1717, was created Earl of Dundee in the Jacobite Peerage "to secure political support at Rome". Giovanni Battista was also Marquis of Corgnolo, near Orvieto (created 1723, Pope Innocent XIII), patrician of Rome and Orvieto, noble of Viterbo and Loreto; between 1713 and 1720, also Duke of Cumia, near Messina (created by Philip V of Spain).

== Arms ==
Coat of arms of the Earl of Dundee
Crest A Lion's Paw erased in bend Or holding a Crooked Sword or Scimitar Argent. Escutcheon Gules a Lion rampant Or armed and langued Azure holding in his dexter forepaw a Crooked Sword or Scimitar Argent; behind the shield in saltire two representations of the Royal Banner of Scotland, viz. a Lion rampant Gules armed and langued Azure within a Double Tressure flory counterflory Gules, Ropes and Tassels of the last (as Bearer for the Sovereign of the Royal Banner of Scotland). Supporters On either side a Greyhound Argent collared Gules. Motto Dissipate (Disperse). Symbolism As Hereditary Royal Standard Bearers, the Earls of Dundee are entitled to use the Royal Banner of Scotland in their arms.
