= John Scrymgeour, 1st Viscount of Dudhope =

Scottish politician

John Scrymgeour or Scrimgeour, 1st Viscount of Dudhope (died 7 March 1642 or 1643) was a Scottish politician.

He succeeded his father James Scrimgeour as hereditary Constable of Dundee and Standard Bearer of Scotland in 1612. He represented Forfarshire in Parliament in 1612, 1617 and 1621, and Argyllshire from 1628 to 1633. On 15 November 1641 he was created Viscount of Dudhope and Lord Scrymgeour, with remainder to his heirs male whatsoever.

== Marriage and children ==
He married Margaret Seton, a daughter of David Seton of Parbroath. Their children included:

- James Scrymgeour, who succeeded in his titles
- Magdalen Scrymgeour who married Alexnder Irvine of Drum
- Mary Scrymgeour, who married Peter Hay of Megginch

Margaret Seton, Lady Dudhope, was a friend of Jean Drummond, Countess of Roxburghe, whose stepdaughter Isobel Ker was married to their son, James Scrimgeour, later 2nd Viscount Dudhope. The Countess of Roxburghe visited them at Dudhope Castle in 1619. John Scrimgeour ordered a pair of pistols as a gift for her husband Lord Roxburghe from a gunsmith in Dundee.

Peerage of Scotland
New creation	Viscount of Dudhope; 1641–1643	Succeeded by James Scrymgeour
