= Birkhill Castle =

Residence of the Earl of Dundee

Coordinates: 56°23′52″N 3°04′39″W

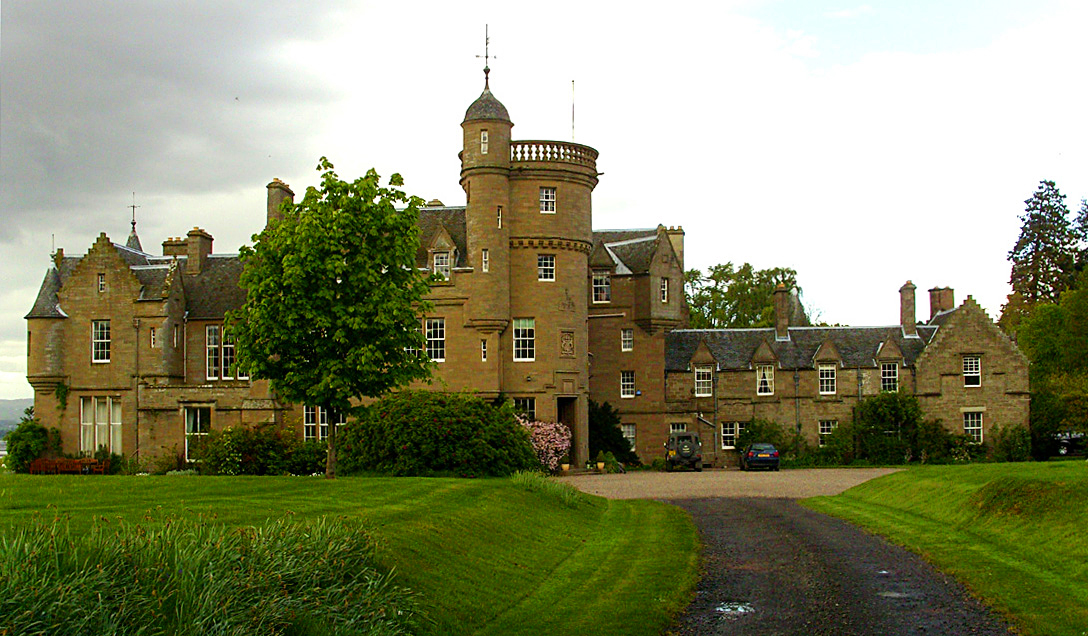
Birkhill Castle

Birkhill Castle is a stately home, the residence of the Earl of Dundee, located on the banks of the River Tay, a short drive from St. Andrews.

The castle is operated as a commercial venture offering facilities for corporate and private groups. It is also a venue for weddings.

== History ==
Birkhill Castle is located on the banks of the River Tay estuary in Fife. It is the home of the Earl and Countess of Dundee and their four children. The Dundee family run Birkhill Castle and he Lord Dundee works in the House of Lords, where he is a representative peer. Lord Dundee is the Hereditary Royal Standard Bearer of Scotland. His ancestor was awarded this position by Scottish King Alexander II in the 13th century and his predecessors carried the Scottish banner of William Wallace at Stirling Bridge and Robert the Bruce at Bannockburn. Bruce appointed the flag bearer and his successors as custodians of the city of Dundee. In 1780 the family built what is now Birkhill Castle.

== The castle ==
The Castle is surrounded by gardens housing an array of rare plants and trees.

Although they are focused on private and corporate groups, their accommodation is also available to the general public.
