= Thomas Scollan =

Scottish trade unionist and politician (1883–1974)

Thomas Scollan (1883 – 28 October 1974) was a Scottish trade unionist and Labour Party politician.

Scollan was an engineer, and an organiser for the National Union of Distributive Workers. He was President of the Scottish Trades Union Congress in 1934.

He was elected at the 1945 general election as the Member of Parliament (MP) for Western Renfrewshire, defeating the sitting Unionist MP Henry Scrymgeour-Wedderburn. Scollan served only one term in Parliament, losing his seat at the 1950 general election to the National Liberal candidate John Scott Maclay.

Scollan died on 28 October 1974, at the age of 91.

Parliament of the United Kingdom
Preceded by Henry Scrymgeour-Wedderburn	Member of Parliament for Western Renfrewshire; 1945 – 1950	Succeeded by John Scott Maclay
