= John Scrymgeour, 1st Earl of Dundee =

John Scrymgeour, 3rd Viscount Dudhope and 1st Earl of Dundee (d. 1668) was a member of the Scottish nobility and fought in the Wars of the Three Kingdoms.

== Biography ==
Scrymgeour was one of the royalist leaders during the civil war. In 1648 he joined with the Duke of Hamilton and General John Middleton, (afterwards first Earl of Middleton), in the attempt to rescue Charles I, and was present in command of a troop of horse at the battle of Preston. He succeeded in escaping to Scotland after the royalist defeat.

Scrymgeour attended Charles II at Stirling Castle in 1651, and marched with him to England on the expedition that terminated at the battle of Worcester. Again he escaped uninjured, and then he joined Middleton in the abortive campaign in the north in 1654. He was captured in the braes of Angus by a party of Cromwellian soldiers, and sent prisoner to London, where he was detained for some time.

At the Restoration his loyalty was rewarded. He was made a privy councillor and created Earl of Dundee on 8 September 1660. He died on 23 June 1668.

== Family ==
Scrymgeour, by his marriage in 1644 with Lady Anne Ramsay, daughter of William Ramsay, 1st Earl of Dalhousie, apparently had no children, and the title was thought extinct, His widow married Sir Henry Bruce of Clackmannan, whose family is now represented by the Earl of Elgin and Kincardine. The titles, however, were successfully claimed in 1952 (Dudhope) and 1953 (Dundee) by Henry Scrymgeour-Wedderburn, 11th Earl of Dundee.

== See also ==
- Cromwell's Act of Grace

== Notes ==
Peerage of Scotland
| New creation | Earl of Dundee; 1660–1668 | Dormant next held by Henry Scrymgeour-Wedderburn |
| Preceded by James Scrymgeour | Viscount of Dudhope; 1644–1668 | Dormant next held by Henry Scrymgeour-Wedderburn |
