= Charles Maitland, 3rd Earl of Lauderdale =

Charles Maitland, 3rd Earl of Lauderdale (c. 1620 – 9 June 1691), was the second son (The Great Seal of Scotland gives him as third son) of John Maitland, 1st Earl of Lauderdale (died 1645) and his wife Isabel Seton.

Maitland was born at Lethington in East Lothian. Following the death of his father-in-law, Richard Lauder of Haltoun, in November 1675, he formally adopted the territorial designation Charles Maitland of Haltoun, although he had the barony of Haltoun settled upon him in fee on 4 December 1660.

Shortly after the Restoration of King Charles II (4 December 1660), Charles Maitland was created sole Captain-General of The Mint for life, and appointed a Privy Counsellor 15 June 1661. He was elected one of the Commissioners for Edinburghshire and Lord of the Articles in the parliament of 1669. On the 1 (or 8) June 1670 he was admitted an Ordinary Lord and Senator of the College of Justice as Lord Haltoun. In February 1671, he succeeded Sir William Bellenden as Treasurer-Depute, and shortly afterwards, following the quarrel between the John Maitland, 1st Duke of Lauderdale and the Earl of Tweeddale, became his brother's chief assistant in the management of Scottish affairs.

By charter of novodamus of 1676, later ratified by the Scots Parliament, King Charles II granted Charles Maitland, Lord Haltoun, "the office of bearing our insignia within our said realm of Scotland". (But in 1952, the Lord Lyon decided that the Earl of Lauderdale's right was to bear the saltire as the Bearer of the National Flag of Scotland, whereas the Earl of Dundee as the Bearer of the Royal Banner bears the Royal Standard of the lion rampant).

In a paper presented by the Duke of Hamilton to King Charles II in 1679, he detailed the grievances under which Scotland then suffered and complained that Lord Haltoun was "overbearing and insolent in the extreme". Upon the fall of The Duke of Lauderdale, Lord Haltoun's enemies began to attack him. He was, in July 1681, accused before parliament of perjury, the prosecution only halted by the adjournment of parliament. In November that year, a letter was procured from the King whereby he was deprived of the honour of presiding in Council, which, in the absence of the Lord Chancellor and Lord Privy Seal, it appears he had formerly enjoyed, and, at the same time, the accounts of the Treasury were ordered to be investigated.

In the same year, Maitland purchased Queensberry House in the Canongate from Margaret Douglas of Balmakellie after he was obliged to give up his 'grace and favour' accommodation at the Palace of Holyrood House. He sold the mansion to William Douglas, 1st Duke of Queensberry in 1686.

In June 1682, a Commission, chiefly composed of his enemies, was appointed to inquire into the coinage and Mint, and, upon their report, he was deprived of his offices, and the Lord Advocate ordered to proceed against him, either civilly or criminally, for malversation. The case was tried in the Court of Session, which, on 20 March 1683, fined Sir John Falconer and him £72,000 sterling, a vast sum for the time. The King mitigated the penalty to £20,000 sterling, ordaining £16,000 to be paid to the Lord Chancellor, and £4000 to Graham of Claverhouse. The latter two disputed as to the division of the spoil, but at length Claverhouse obtained the lands of Dudhope and the Constabulary of Dundee, which procured him, in the following reign, the more honourable title by which history knows him.

Lord Haltoun succeeded his brother as Earl of Lauderdale in 1683, and was readmitted a Privy Counsellor on 11 March 1686.

Elizabeth Lauder, heiress of Haltoun

Charles Maitland married, on 18 November 1652, Elizabeth, younger daughter of Richard Lauder of Haltoun, (nr. Ratho), Sheriff Principal for Edinburgh, &c., the owner of Haltoun House and its lands, as well as extensive properties at Lauder, all of which passed to the Maitlands upon and after his marriage, Lauder's elder daughter having been provided with a money dowry. By a very extensive charter in The Great Seal of Scotland, confirmed at Whitehall, London, on 4 December 1660, Charles Maitland and his heirs male by his marriage were bound to "take the name of Lauder and bear the Arms of Lauder of Haltoun", which was done in accordance with the charter by John Maitland, Charles 2nd son, who received a baronetcy of Nova Scotia as Sir John Lauder. As provided in the charter, when Sir John inherited the Earldom of Lauderdale on the death of his elder brother Richard, he reverted to the surname of Maitland.

The third Earl of Lauderdale died at Haltoun House. He left six sons and two daughters, his eldest son and heir being Richard Maitland, 4th Earl of Lauderdale. Of his daughters: Isobel married John, 8th Lord Elphinstone, and Mary married Charles Carnegie, 4th Earl of Southesk.

Peerage of Scotland
Preceded by John Maitland	Earl of Lauderdale; 1682–1691	Succeeded by Richard Maitland
