= Dudhope Castle =

Castle in Dundee, Scotland

Coordinates: 56°27′52″N 2°59′2″W

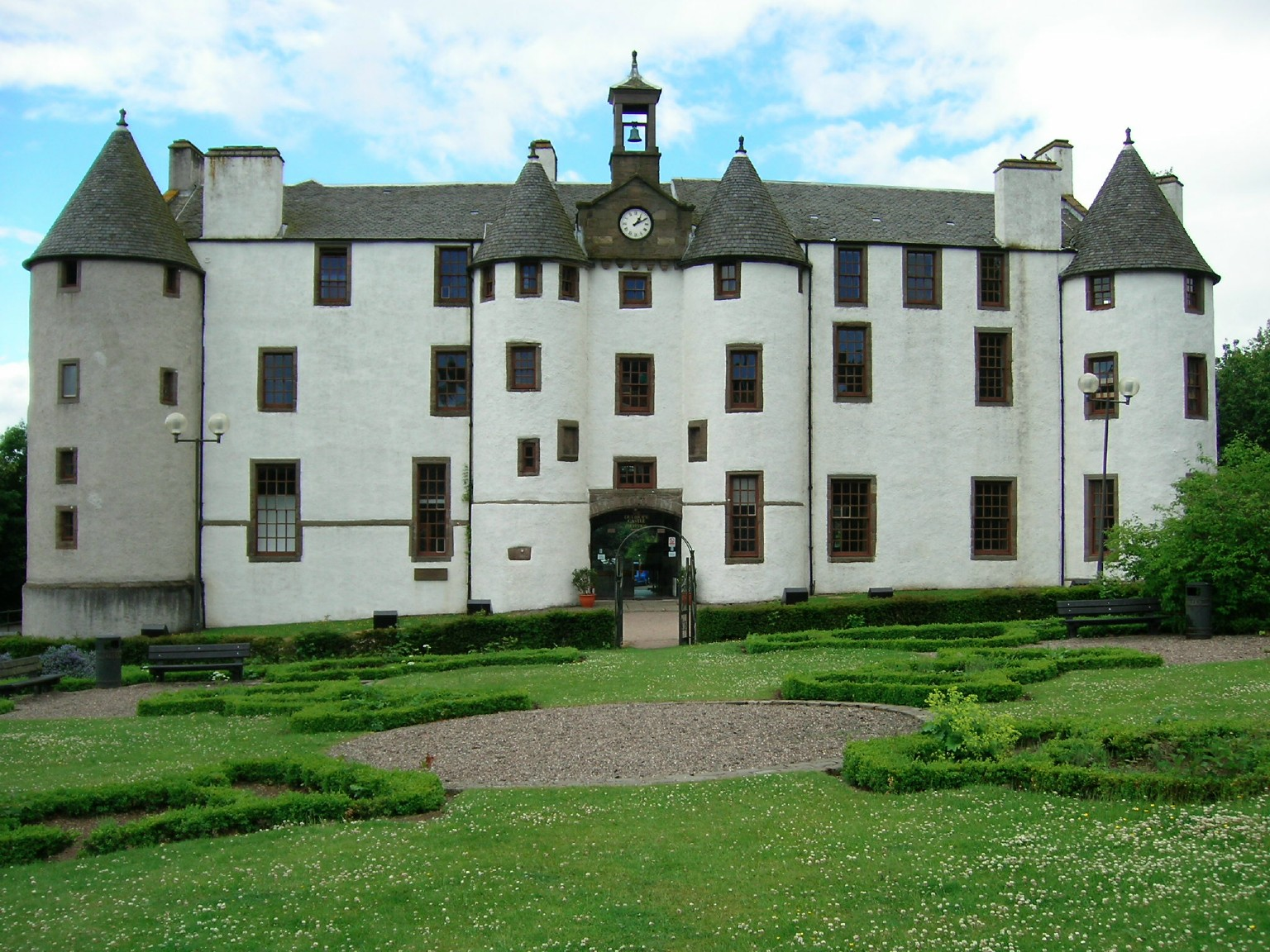
Dudhope Castle from the east

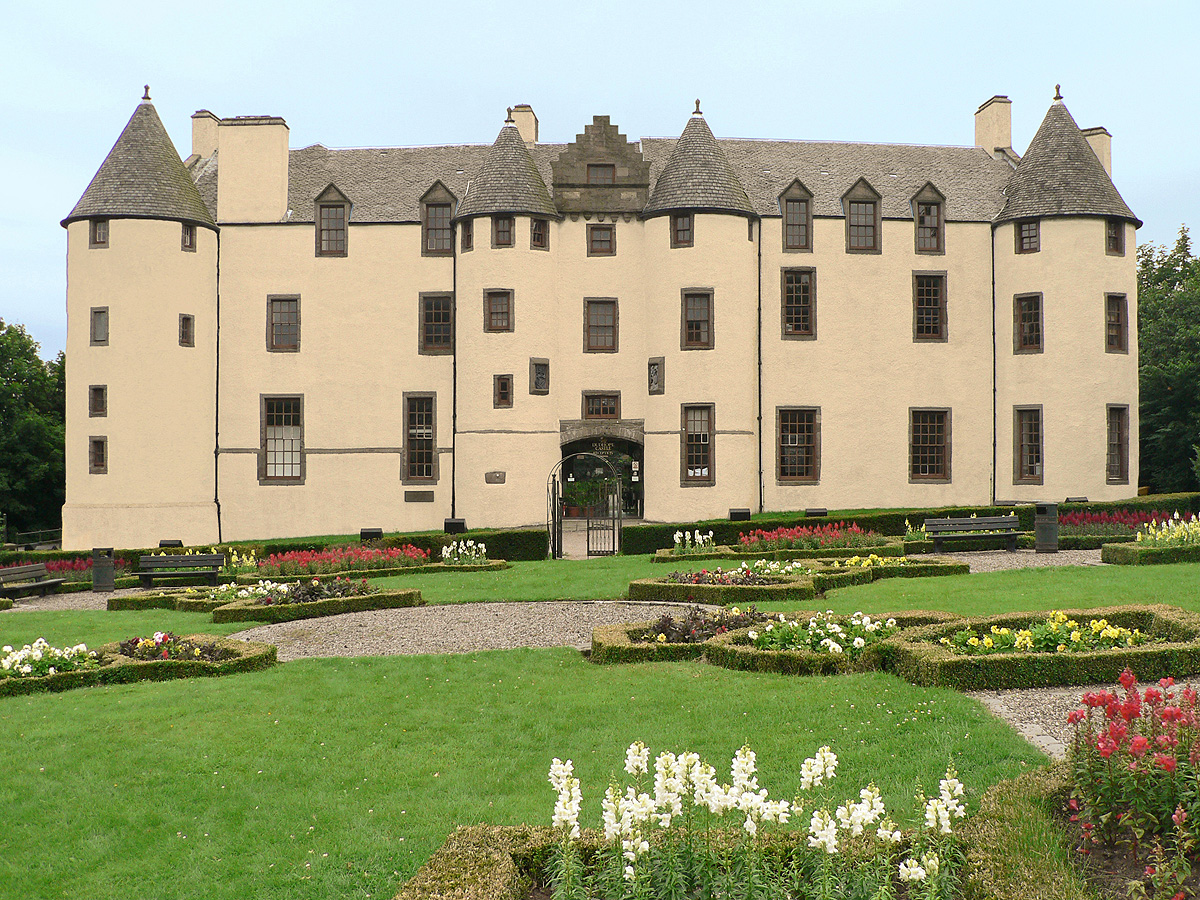
Dudhope Castle: ideal restoration

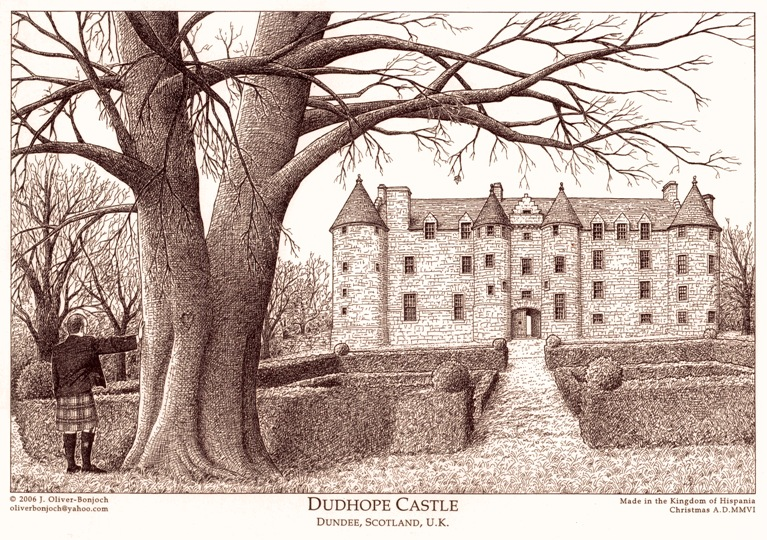
Artist's impression of Dudhope Castle in the early 19th century.

Dudhope Castle is an extended late medieval tower house located on the southern face of Dundee Law in Dundee, Scotland.

== History ==
=== Construction and private ownership ===
The castle was originally built in the late 13th century by the Scrymgeour family, with the original castle being a smaller tower house. This was replaced around 1460.

James V visited in April 1540. The castle was further extended in 1580 for James Scrimgeour and Magdalen Livingstone to its current L-plan structure with additional circular "angle" towers, although these were demolished in the 18th century. Some dormer or storm windows had stone pediments dated "1600", with the initials "DML" for Dame Magdalen Livingstone. James VI and I was at Dudhope on 23 April 1602 and 20 May 1617.

On the death in 1668 of John Scrimgeour, 13th (or 14th) Constable, and first Earl of Dundee, King Charles II ignored the existence of the rightful heir, John Scrimgeour of Kirkton, and made a grant of Dudhope Castle and the office of Constable to Charles Maitland, a younger brother of the 1st Duke of Lauderdale.

Later, when in financial difficulty, Maitland sold Dudhope Castle in 1684 to John Graham of Claverhouse, better known to most as "Bonnie Dundee". It was from Dudhope Castle that he departed for Killiecrankie in 1689; the victory which resulted in his death. In 1694, the King therefore made a grant of Dudhope Castle to Archibald Douglas. The Douglas family were thus the last family of occupants of the castle as this continued until about 1790. The history of Dudhope and the Constables are therefore inextricably interwoven with the history of Dundee. In fact, the two are inseparable. The office of Constable and occupancy of Dudhope Castle was held by four different families, as above, of which the Scrymgeours held the post for some 370 years.

=== Other uses of the castle ===
In 1792 the castle was rented in an attempt to use it as a woollen factory, although the plan never came to fruition. In 1795 the park and the grounds were leased to the Board of Ordnance, who used Dudhope as a barracks for 95 years, from 1796 to 1879. Additional buildings were constructed, including a hospital, officers quarters, stables and guard-rooms. The castle building itself was used as accommodation for 400 soldiers. The Board of Ordnance finally abandoned the castle in 1881.

In 1854 the town council of Dundee acquired a sub-lease on the castle grounds, for use as recreational facilities. The lease ran for 35 1/2 years for an annual rent of £25 until 1 November 1890. At this time the Earl of Home had intended to develop the grounds into terraced housing.

Instead the council acquired the grounds for £31,700, raising £20,000 itself and the remaining being raised from generous citizens by Lord Provost Mathewson. The grounds were opened as a park on 28 September 1895 by Sir James Low.

The building was later occupied by the Ministry of Works and was used as a military barracks during both the 1914–18 war and the 1939–45 war. A time gun was formerly located in the grounds of the castle and fired daily at 1pm. It ceased to be used in 1916 so as not do disturb patients at the nearby Dundee Royal Infirmary who were suffering from shell-shock.

=== Redevelopment ===
The castle passed to the corporation of Dundee, which made an attempt to demolish the castle in 1958. In the years 1985 to 1988 the castle was redeveloped and was in use as offices, a conference centre as well as housing the University of Abertay Dundee's Dundee Business School. During restoration, one of the main rooms was designated as the Scrimgeour room. It is furnished with wall hangings pertinent to the Scrimgeours and the drapes on the windows are made from material in the Scrimgeour tartan as arranged by the Scrimgeour Clan Association that was officially organized on 5 June 1971. In March 1998 a special dinner was held by the Clan Association in memory of the 700th anniversary of a charter to the Scrimgeours signed by William Wallace on 29 March 1298 and later reaffirmed in another charter signed by Robert the Bruce on 5 December of that same year.

After being used by the University of Abertay the building passed back to Dundee City Council and was used as offices and training spaces for the local authority. In 2022 the castle was leased to The Circle Scotland who use the space to provide affordable office space to the 3rd sector in the city.
