= John Graham, 1st Viscount Dundee =

Scottish army officer (1648–1689)

The Right Honourable The Viscount Dundee
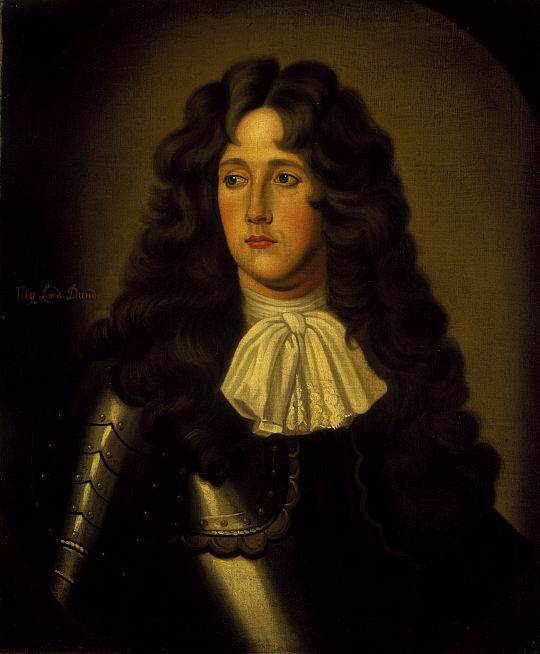
- Portrait c. 1675
- Born: 21 July 1648; Glen Ogilvie, near Glamis, Angus
- Died: 27 July 1689 (aged 41); Killiecrankie, Perthshire
- Burial place: St Bride's Kirk, Blair Castle, Perthshire
- Military career
- Allegiance: Kingdom of France (1672–1674); Dutch Republic (1674–1678); Kingdom of Scotland 1678–1689
- Branch: French Royal Army; Dutch States Army; Scots Army
- Service years: 1672–1689
- Rank: Major general
- Nicknames: Bluidy Clavers, Bonnie Dundee
- Units: Lockhart's Regiment; Scots Brigade
- Commands: Jacobite Commander in Chief for Scotland
- Conflicts: Franco-Dutch War; Battle of Cassel (1677); Battle of Saint-Denis (1678); Battle of Drumclog; Battle of Bothwell Brig; Argyll's Rising; Jacobite rising of 1689; Battle of Killiecrankie †

Major-General John Graham of Claverhouse, 1st Viscount Dundee (21 July 1648 – 27 July 1689) was a Scottish army officer. A Tory and Episcopalian, he was responsible for policing southwest Scotland to suppress religious unrest and rebellion of Covenanters during the late 17th century. His allegedly brutal conduct during this period led him to be nicknamed "Bluidy Clavers".

As a general in the Scots Army, Claverhouse was made Viscount Dundee by James VII of Scotland, and remained loyal to James after the Glorious Revolution deposed him. Dundee rallied Highland clans loyal to the Jacobite cause and led the Jacobite rising of 1689 to victory at the Battle of Killiecrankie, where he died. The rising was unsuccessful, but Claverhouse posthumously was made a Jacobite hero, acquiring the soubriquet "Bonnie Dundee".

== Early life ==
Coat of arms of the Viscount Dundee.

The Graham family was descended from Robert III of Scotland through his second daughter Princess Mary. John Graham was the elder son of Sir William Graham and Lady Madeline Carnegie, from a junior branch of the family that had acquired the estate of Claverhouse near Dundee. Graham was a direct descendant of Sir David Graham of Kincardine, a signatory of the 1320 Declaration of Arbroath, and who received the estate of Old Montrose from Robert the Bruce as a token of gratitude for his role in leading Scottish troops in the First War of Independence. His date of birth is disputed but generally assumed to be in 1648. He had two sisters and was educated with his younger brother David at the University of St Andrews, graduating in 1661.

While closely related to James Graham, 1st Marquess Montrose, known as the "Great Montrose", William Graham did not join his Highland Campaign of 1644–1645. John and David became wards of their uncles and other relatives after his death around 1652. (Note: Scott cites documents which show that William died between 17 June 1652 and 29 January 1653.) In 1660, they were listed as burgesses of Dundee, 'by reason of their father's privilege' and John Graham inherited the Claverhouse estate when he came of age in the summer of 1669.

The Claverhouse properties included a house in Glen Ogilvie in the Sidlaw Hills to the north of Dundee (since demolished), Claypotts Castle, and a house at Mill of Mains. In 1669 Graham's maternal uncle, David Carnegie, Lord Lour, secured him an appointment as a Commissioner of Excise and Justice of the Peace for Angus. (Note: The commission was granted in February 1669, but withdrawn in September on the grounds that Claverhouse was still a minor. The commission was restored in September, suggesting that Claverhouse had turned 21 by then, and was therefore born in 1648.)

== Service during the Franco–Dutch War 1672–1678 ==
As a result of the Wars of the Three Kingdoms, many in both Scotland and England viewed standing armies as a threat to individual liberty and society itself. Lack of opportunities at home meant those like Claverhouse who wanted a military career joined units in foreign service, such as the French Irish Brigade or the Dutch Scots Brigade. Loyalties were often based on religion or personal relationships, while officers frequently moved between armies; Marshal Turenne (1611–1675), considered the greatest French general of his time, was a Protestant who served in the Dutch army from 1625 to 1630 before changing allegiance.

When the Franco-Dutch War broke out in 1672, England was allied with France, largely due to secret payments made by Louis XIV to Charles II. Claverhouse was appointed Captain in Sir William Lockhart's Scots Regiment, part of an Anglo-Scots brigade commanded by the Duke of Monmouth that served with the French during 1673–1674. Supporting Catholic France against the Protestant Dutch Republic was unpopular, especially in Scotland which had close cultural end economic links and England withdrew from the war after the 1674 Treaty of Westminster.

Many members of the Anglo-Scots Brigade now enrolled with the Dutch, including Claverhouse. This unit had been part of the Dutch army since the 1580s and despite the name, normally contained a mixture of regiments recruited in Scotland and England. Withdrawn in 1672, the English units were restored in 1674 but since the Scots regiments had also lost much of their national identity, a deliberate policy was adopted to re-establish them as English and Scottish units. Claverhouse fought at the Battle of Seneffe in 1674, where it is alleged he rescued the young William of Orange, although this appears doubtful.

In the absence of a permanent army, the Scots Brigade was an important source of military professionals for both Charles II and James II (and VII), who nominally controlled the appointment of officers. In reality, this required negotiation and many Brigade officers were political and religious exiles, particularly after the 1679–81 Exclusion Crisis; in 1680, Charles tried to appoint the Catholic Earl of Dumbarton as Brigade commander but William refused. James in particular tracked the careers of potential supporters, like the Catholics Thomas Buchan and Alexander Cannon, also officers in the Scots Brigade and who replaced Claverhouse after his death at Killiecrankie. In early 1678, Claverhouse resigned his commission and returned to Scotland; one suggestion is this was due to a disciplinary incident which led to him being passed over for promotion.

== Military service in Scotland ==
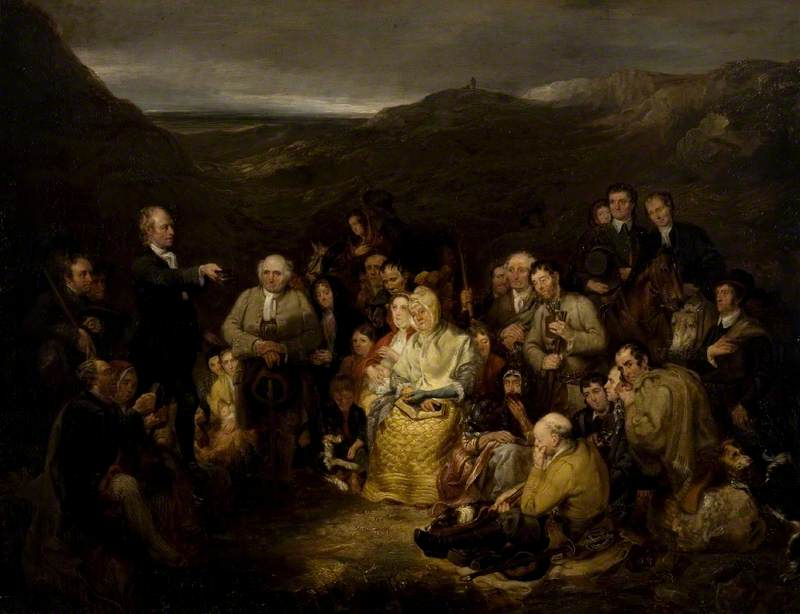
Conventicle field meeting held by Presbyterian dissidents; Claverhouse was employed in their suppression

With James' recommendation, in September 1678 Claverhouse was given command of one of the 'Highland' companies employed to police South-West Scotland; unlike the earlier semi-private 'Independent' companies, these were funded by the government. While the primary objective was the suppression of illegal Presbyterian field meetings or Conventicles, it was also driven by the conflict between the Presbyterian Earl of Argyll and the equally Presbyterian Macleans over control of Mull.

Demarcation disputes between Claverhouse and regional magnates such as the Earl of Queensberry meant he had to tread carefully; in December 1678, the regular clergy complained when he told them that he had no orders to apprehend anyone for past misdemeanours. The situation then exploded when Covenanter militants killed Archbishop James Sharp on 3 May 1679.

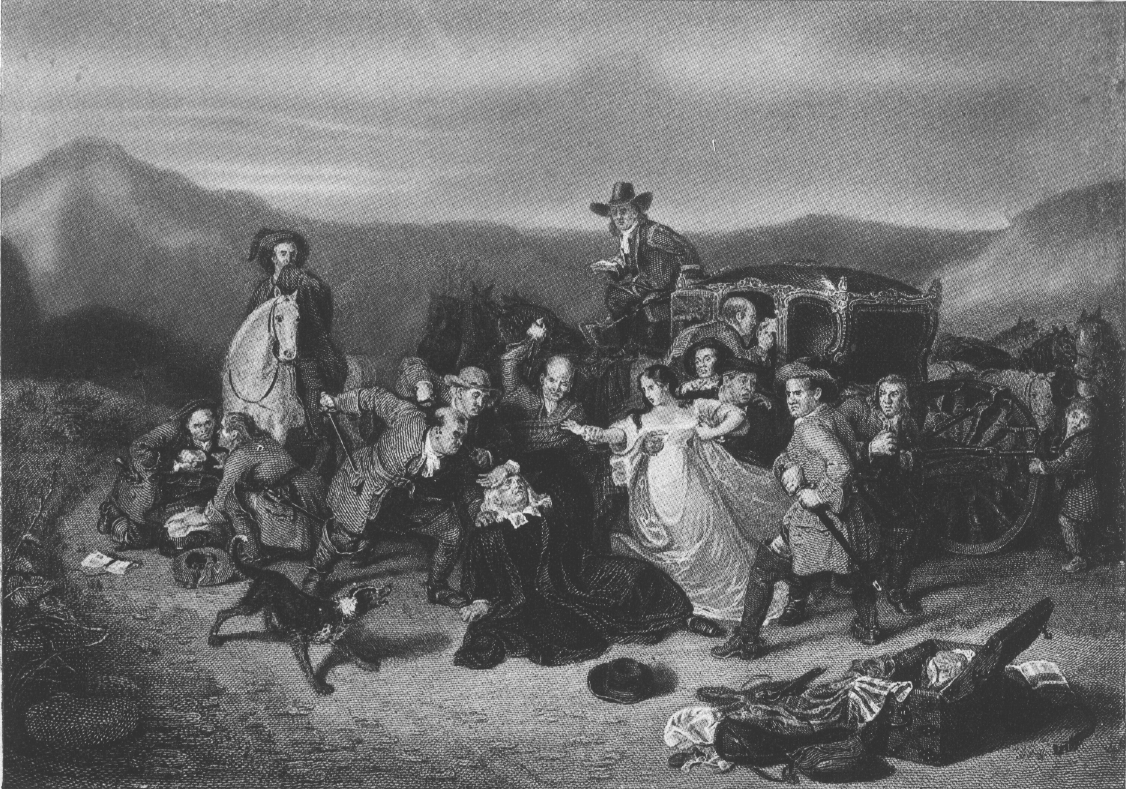
The murder of Archbishop James Sharp on 3 May 1679.

Hearing news of a large conventicle on 1 June 1679, Claverhouse located it near Loudoun Hill but "little to our advantage; for, when we came in sight of them, we found them drawn up in batell, upon a most advantagious ground, to which there was no coming but through mosses and lakes. They were not preaching... They consisted of four battalions of foot, and all well armed with fusils and pitchforks, and three squadrons of horse."

The Covenanter force was led by 19-year-old William Cleland, who had positioned them at the top of a hill, with a marsh in front; after exchanging fire, the 240 dragoons advanced but became stuck in the wet ground and seeing this, the Covenanters charged. Claverhouse's horse was wounded and maddened by pain, carried him away from the battle, with his troopers following; the Battle of Drumclog was little more than a skirmish but cost the government 36 men and raised Covenanter morale.

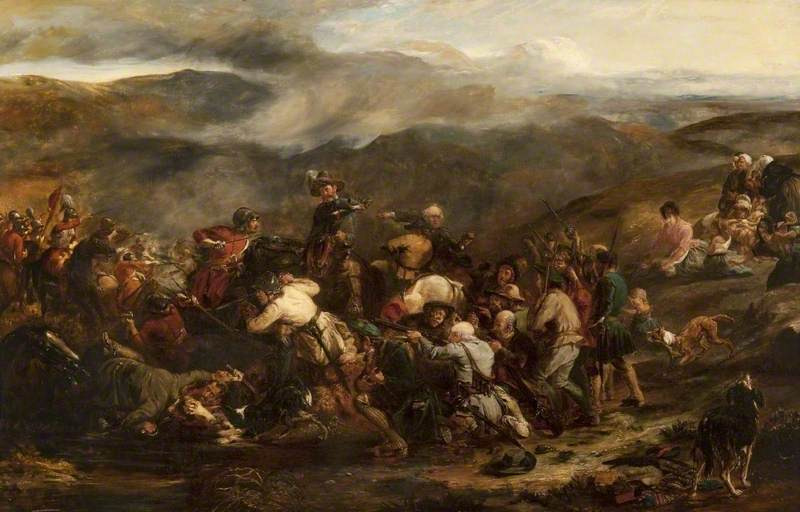
Drumclog, 1 June 1679; Claverhouse was unexpectedly defeated by a Covenanter force

He later wrote to the Earl of Linlithgow that the Covenanters:

"resolved a generall engadgment, and immediately advanced with there foot, the horse following: they came throght the lotche ... they recaived our fyr, and advanced to shok: the first they gave us broght down the Coronet Mr Crafford and Captain Bleith, besides that with a pitchfork they made such an opening in my rone horse's belly, that his guts hung out half an elle, and yet he caryed me aff an myl: which so discouraged our men, that they sustained not the shok, but fell into disorder".

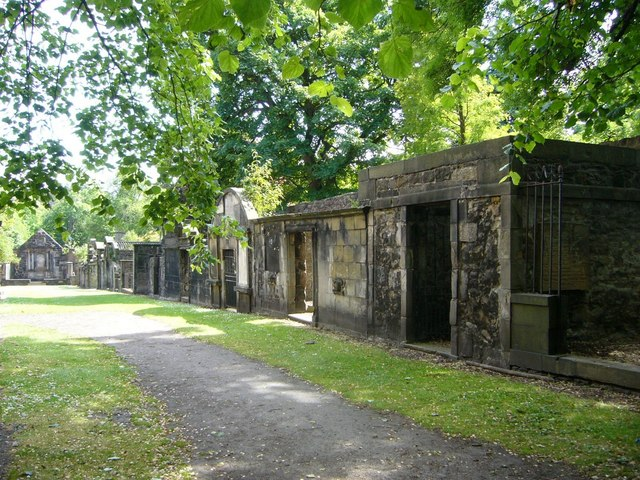
Prison in Greyfriars Kirkyard, where captured Covenanters were held after Bothwell Bridge

Claverhouse returned to Glasgow, which the Covenanters briefly besieged but could not take without artillery. On 3 June, Claverhouse and his troops headed for Stirling Castle, the strongest fort in Scotland to await the arrival of reinforcements under Monmouth, which included the militia and two regiments of dragoons. He escaped censure for Drumclog but was made subordinate to Monmouth; on 22 June, the sides met again at the Battle of Bothwell Brig and this time the Covenanters were routed.

Nearly 1200 Covenanter prisoners were held at Greyfriars Kirkyard in Edinburgh; Claverhouse was dispatched to London to protest against Monmouth's alleged leniency towards them. This began his close relationship with James, who in 1680 awarded him the barony of Freuch in Galloway.

In January 1681, he was appointed to the sheriffships of Wigtown, Dumfries, Kirkcudbright and Annandale. In December 1682, he was appointed colonel of a new regiment to be raised in Scotland. He had still greater honours in view. In January 1683, the case of the Earl of Lauderdale was debated in the House of Lords. Lauderdale was proprietor of the lands and lordship of Dundee and Dudhope, and the decree of the Lords against him was issued in March 1683 for the sum of 72,000 pounds. Claverhouse succeeded in having the Castle of Dudhope (part of the property of the defaulter) and Lauderdale's title of Constable of Dundee transferred to him by royal grant in 1684. In May 1683, he was nominated to the Privy Council of Scotland.

== Marriage and promotion ==
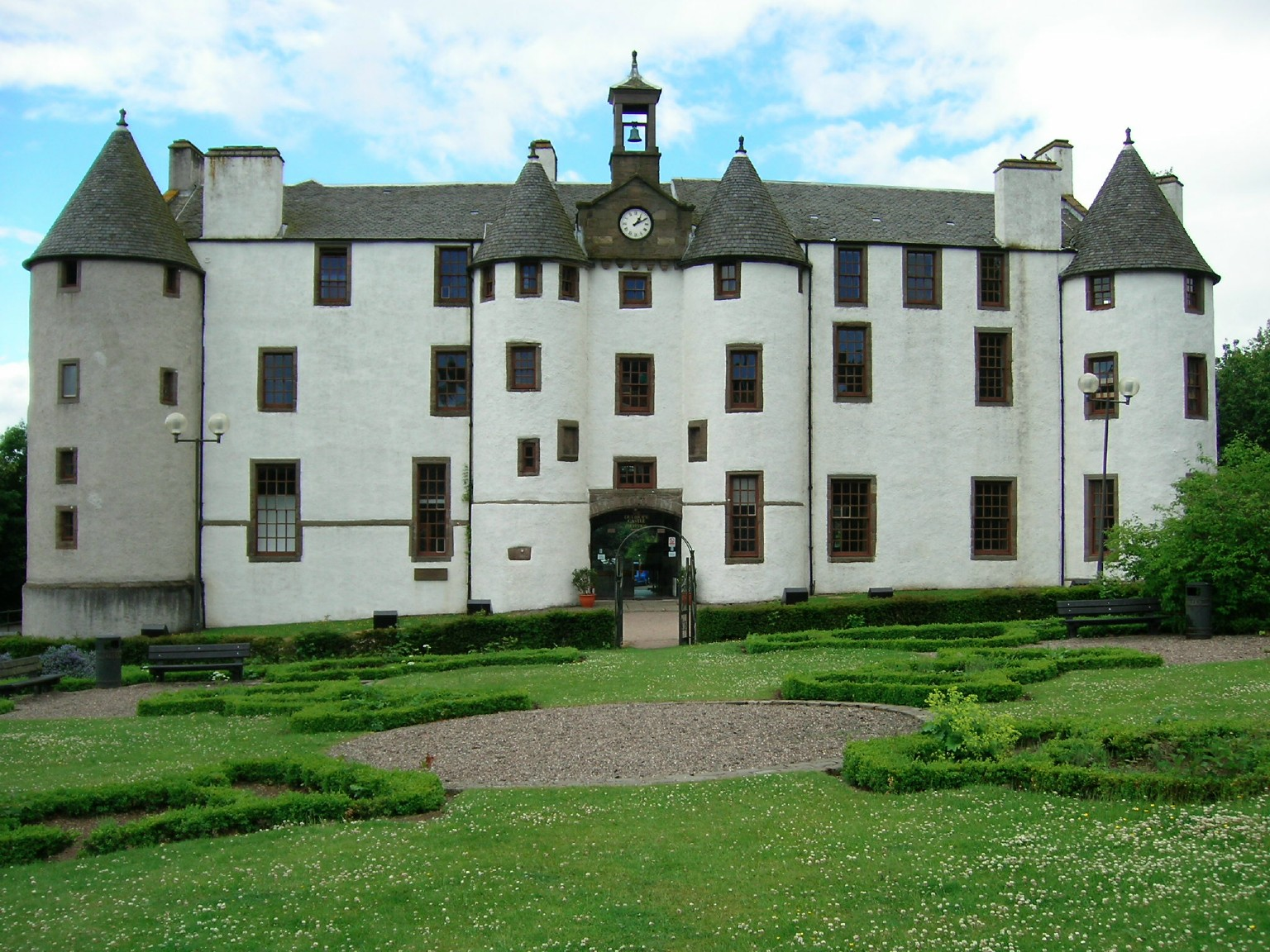
Dudhope Castle, home of Viscount Dundee.

In 1684, he married Lady Jeane Cochrane, granddaughter of William Cochrane, 1st Earl of Dundonald, a staunch Covenanter. Shortly after the death of Charles II in 1685, Claverhouse incurred a temporary disgrace – he stood up for the rights of ordinary soldiers who were being poorly treated – by his deposition from the office of privy councillor; but he was reinstated in May, although his commission of justiciary, which had expired, was not renewed. In 1686, he was promoted to the rank of major-general, and given the additional position of Constable, the dignity of Lord Provost of Dundee. One of his first acts as Provost was to abolish the death penalty for theft under his jurisdiction. In 1688, he was second-in-command to General Douglas in the army which had been ordered to England to aid the falling dynasty of the Stuarts. In the same year, however, he was created Viscount Dundee by James VII while with the Scots army in England. He was also given military command of all the King's forces in Scotland.

== Service after the Revolution of 1688 ==
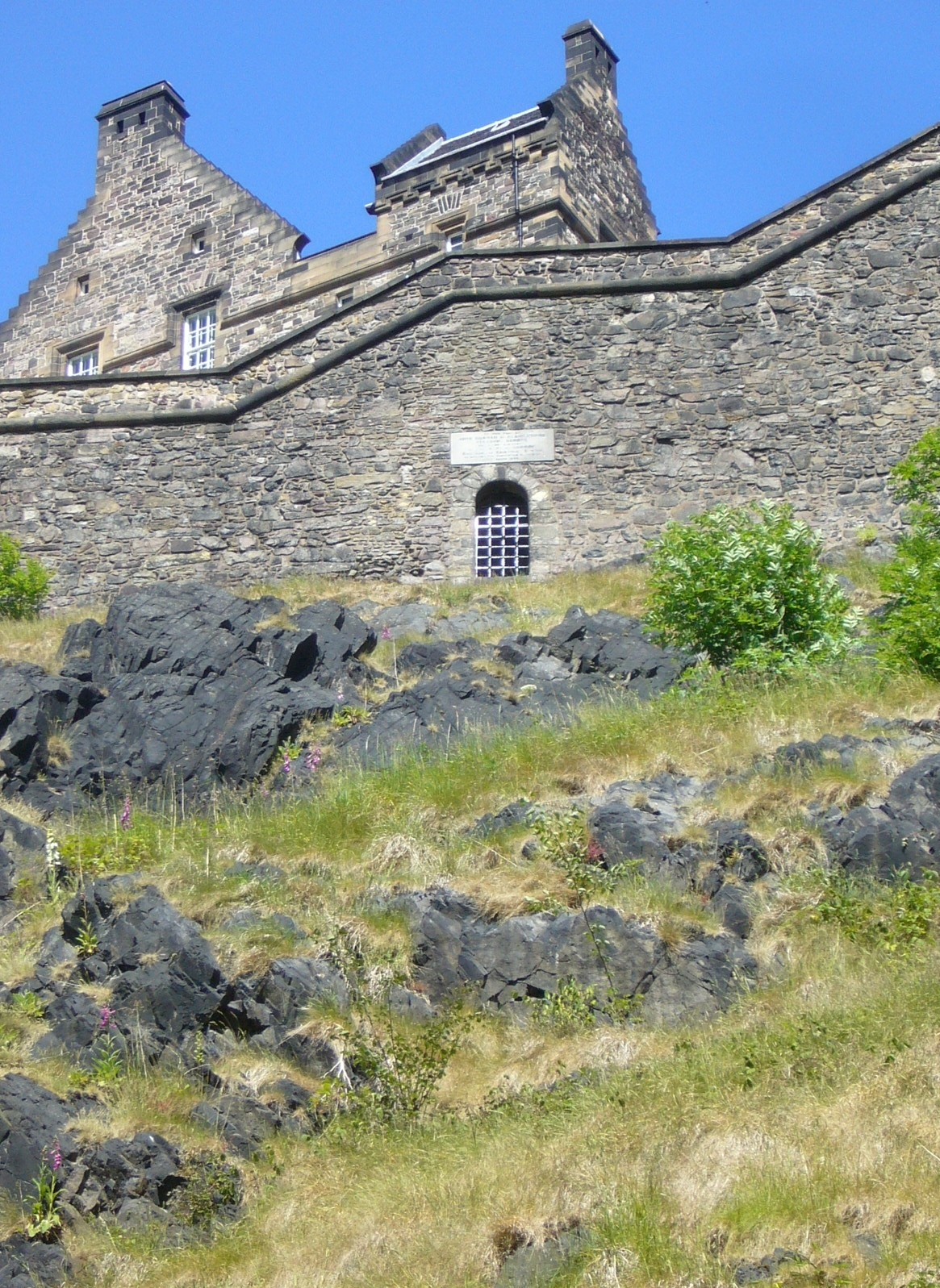
The current postern of Edinburgh Castle dating from around 1735, near where Dundee conferred with Gordon in March 1689 at the previously existing postern.

Dundee returned to Scotland in anticipation of the meeting of the Convention of Estates in Edinburgh, and at once exerted himself to bolster the waning resolution of the Duke of Gordon, the governor of Edinburgh Castle, with regard to holding it for the King. The Convention proving hostile, he conceived the idea of forming a rival convention at Stirling to sit in the name of James VII, but the hesitancy of his associates rendered the design futile, and it was given up. Prior to this, on 18 March 1689, he had left Edinburgh at the head of a company of fifty loyal dragoons, who were strongly attached to his leadership. He was not long gone before the news was brought to the alarmed convention that he had been spotted clambering up the castle rock and holding a conference with Gordon.

Dundee retired to Dudhope. On 30 March, despite a letter to the Convention stating that he was not in arms and that he was living peacefully at home awaiting the birth of his first child, he was publicly denounced as a traitor. He had offered to give a bond or parole to no avail and in the latter half of April attempts were made to apprehend him at Dudhope, and at his residence in Glen Ogilvy; but the secrecy and speed of his movements outwitted his pursuers, and he retreated to the north.

In 1689, after the overthrow of King James VII, he continued to support the Stuart dynasty in his capacity as commander-in-chief of all Scottish forces. On 13 April, Dundee raised the Scottish Royal Standard on Dundee Law in support of his king, country and the Jacobite cause. However, in spite of his subsequent association with the city of Dundee, he was to face what the historian of Jacobitism, Bruce Lenman, has described as a "stony faced" reception from its townsfolk. It is claimed that Dundee's association with the city was brief and unpopular as he was seen as the representative of an arbitrary authoritarian monarchy that was eroding the self-autonomy the burgh had enjoyed.

Indeed, when he returned to Dundee with a small troop of horse (Dundee Law at that time lay outside the burgh walls) he was to find the walls guarded and the gates firmly shut. The city was heavily garrisoned by Williamite forces at the time which may better explain why the gates were barred to him. The fact that the large force in Dundee made no attempt to give battle or capture him may actually suggest they were to some degree sympathetic to his cause. Later events show that cavalry based in Dundee at the time later attempted to defect and join his forces. For four months he rallied support in the hope that King James would return from Ireland, showing considerable skill in letter-writing and diplomacy and deploying successful skirmishing tactics to buy himself time.

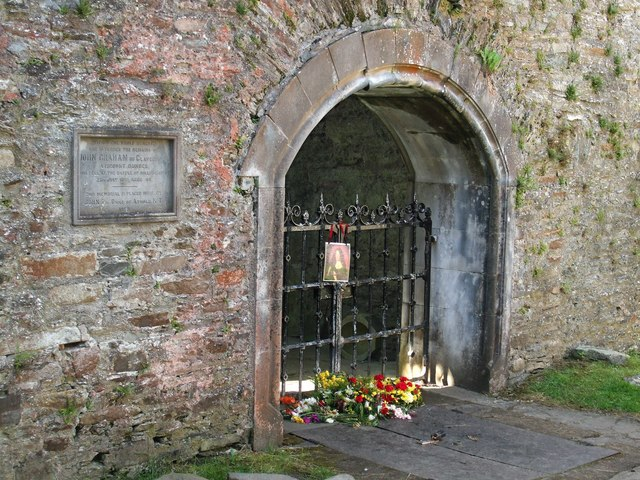
Crypt at St. Bride's near Blair Atholl

His greatest victory was won at the Battle of Killiecrankie later that year against much greater Williamite forces led by General Hugh Mackay. Scott believes that Dundee's death in victory as he led the Jacobite charge down the hill at sunset was the final desperate act of a man who was aware that he had been betrayed by Melfort, the King's adviser, and was trying to overcompensate for their lack of support. The Highlanders were completely victorious, but Dundee was shot through the head by a musket ball in a volley by MacKay's regiment, as evinced by the stripped body when recovered from the battlefield. However, traditional legend has it that he was shot through his breastplate, which is supposedly held in Blair Castle (even though Claverhouse's body was stripped) which was forged when the Duke of Atholl commissioned his blacksmith to bore this hole. In legends, a dying Dundee reputedly asked a soldier "How goes the day?", to which the man replied, "Well for King James, but I am sorry for your lordship." The dying Dundee then replied, "If it goes well for him, it matters the less for me." Alternatively, as he lay dying, Dundee wrote to James VII: →"It has pleased God to give your forces a great victory over ye Rebels... This absolut Victory made us Masters of ye field & ye Enemy's Baggage wch I gave to your soldiers, who to doo them all right both officers & common men, Highlands and Lowlands & Irish behaved themselves with Wqual Gallantry Wt ever I saw in ye hottest Batles fought abroad by disciplined armies, and this MacKay's old soldiers felt on this Occasion... my wounds forbid me to enlarge to your Matie. at this time, tho they tell me they are no mortal. however Sr I beseech your Matie, to believe whether I live or dye I am entirely yours. DUNDIE" Derek Patrick cites other confusions in information and differing accounts of Dundee's death in the aftermath of the battle, including being bewitched or betrayed by a government agent in his army (which Patrick described as "almost certainly nonsense"), and asserts his understanding that these alternative accounts are fabricated.

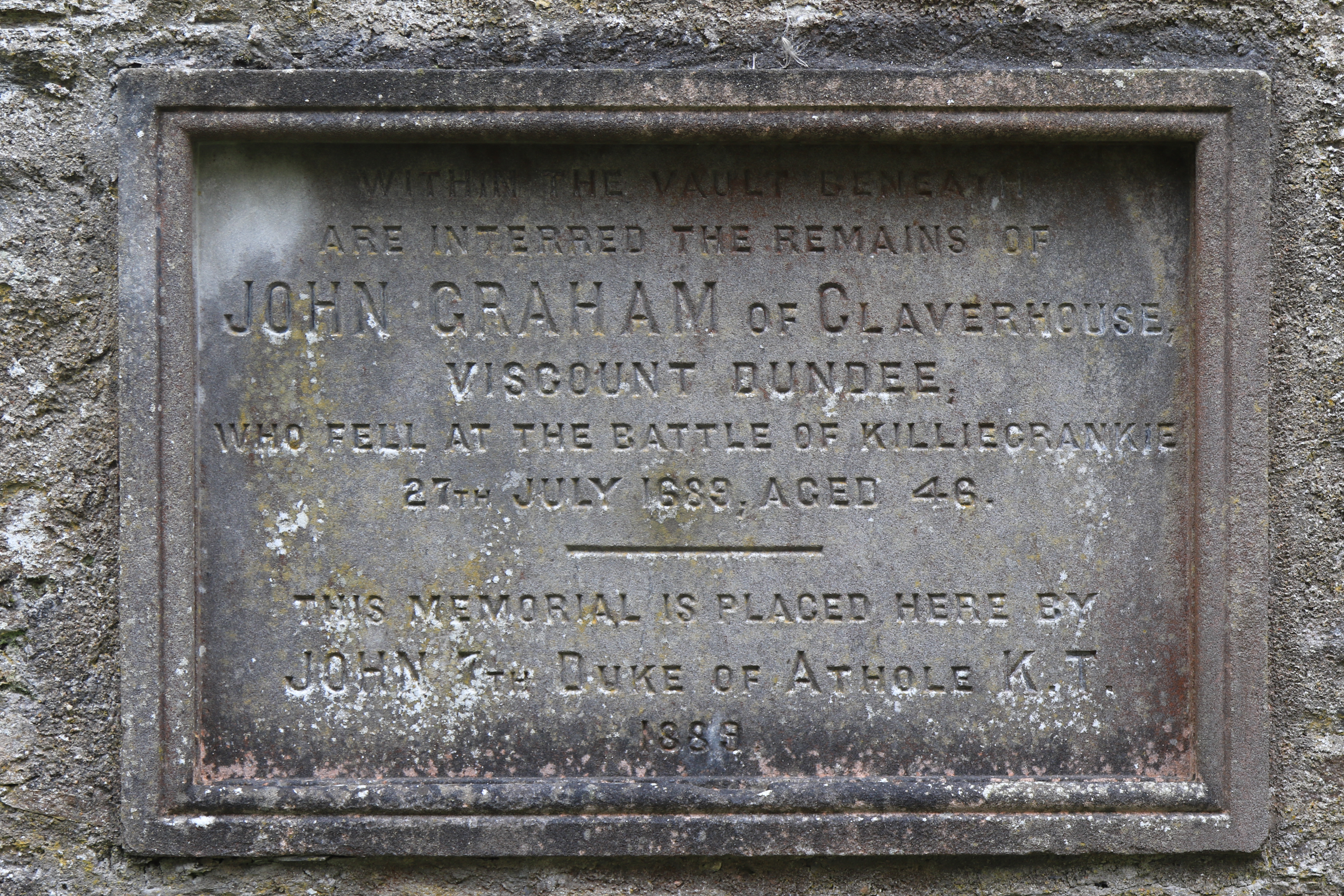
Memorial in St Bride's Kirk, Old Blair

The battle, disastrous as it was to the government forces, was in reality the end of the insurrection, for the controlling and commanding genius of the rebellion was no more. The death of Dundee, in the midst of the confusion of a cavalry charge, became the subject of numerous legends, the best known of which was the long prevalent but of course, entirely false tale that he was invulnerable to lead (due to having made a pact with the Devil) and was killed by being penetrated by a silver button from his own coat. He died on the battlefield and was carried the few miles to the nearby parish church of St Bride, above Blair Castle, where he was buried. The stone which commemorates him at the crypt gives his age (erroneously) as 46, when he was actually 41. Dundee's alleged helmet and breastplate, removed from the vault below the church in the 19th century, are preserved in Blair Castle.

The tune under the title of "Bonnie Dundee" (or "Bonny Dundee") predated Claverhouse's appointment as Viscount Dundee, and several 18th-century songs under that title refer to the city of Dundee and not Claverhouse. With Walter Scott's publication around 1828 of his poem adapting the old tune to praise Claverhouse, the phrase "bonnie Dundee" became generally associated with the Viscount rather than the town, though the older ballads were still published.

== Covenanter historiography ==
After his death, Presbyterian historians dubbed Dundee "Bluidy Clavers". Contemporary evidence for the fairness of this soubriquet in the Covenanting tradition is mixed. Tales of the Covenanters and Covenanter monuments hold Claverhouse directly responsible for the deaths of adherents of the movement. On the other hand, Claverhouse's own letters frequently recommended lenient treatment of Covenanters, and in 1684 he married into a prominent Covenanter family.

In Claverhouse (1887) by Mowbray Walter Morris, cruelty in the area of Dumfriesshire to Covenanters is largely attributed to Robert Grierson of Lag. In contrast Thomas Buchan of the Earl of Mar's Regiment, in south-west Scotland for the repressive "killing time" period of harsh enforcement against Covenanters, was considered by Presbyterian chroniclers to have stayed within legal limits. In the case of the execution of John Brown of Priesthill in Muirkirk parish, Ayrshire, on 1 May 1685, Claverhouse himself ordered Brown to be shot summarily by his troops, on the basis of incriminating evidence.

== In literature ==
- The Grameid, an epic poem in Latin on the Claverhouse campaign of 1689 was written by James Philip of Almerieclos, an Angus laird who was Dundee's kinsman and standard-bearer.
- Claverhouse's campaign is the subject of a poem called Bonnie Dundee written by Sir Walter Scott in 1830 (later adapted into a song known as "The Bonnets o' Bonnie Dundee")
- Claverhouse is one of the central characters in Sir Walter Scott's novel, Old Mortality (1816), and appears as one of the Royalist characters doomed to hell in Wandering Willie's tale in Redgauntlet. He also features in James Hogg's novel The Brownie of Bodsbeck (1818) and John Galt's novel of the Killing Times, Ringan Gilhaize (1823).
- Claverhouse is the subject of Rosemary Sutcliff's 1983 young adult novel, "Bonnie Dundee". (In exile in Holland, Hugh Herriot recalls the exploits of his youth as a follower of Bonnie Dundee who tried to win back Scotland for the Catholic King James and whose death during a victorious battle proved to be a final blow for the Jacobite cause.)
- "The Phoenix and the Laurel" (1954), a historical novel by Jane Lane also takes the story of Claverhouse as its subject.
- In The Dagger with Wings, one of the Father Brown short stories of G. K. Chesterton, a character tells Father Brown that Dundee sold his soul to the Devil. Father Brown dismisses the idea, saying that "John Graham was simply a seventeenth-century professional soldier, rather better than most".
- Robert Burns wrote in "The Braes O'Killiecrankie", that "The bold Pitcur fell in a furr', and Claver'se gat a clankie -O/ Or I had fed an Athole gled, on the Braes o' Killiecrankie-O", the meaning of which is that the speaker would have been carrion but for the misfortunes of the two Jacobite stalwarts.
- John Watson under the pen name Ian Maclaren wrote the historical novel Graham of Claverhouse, which was published in 1907. The novel also appeared serialized in newspapers, an example of which was the Muncie, Indiana Star Press .
- In 1984, Dutch author A. Alberts (Albert Alberts) published his 'De Zilveren Kogel' (The Silver Bullet) with Claverhouse as the central character.
- Claverhouse (1937) a biography by Elizabeth MacKintosh, known by the pen name Josephine Tey but here writing as Gordon Daviot.

== Citations ==
Peerage of Scotland
Preceded by William Graham	Laird of Claverhouse; 1669–1689	Succeeded by James Graham
New title	Viscount Dundee; 1688–1689	Succeeded by James Graham
