= Viscount Dundee =

Viscountcy of Dundee
- Creation date: 12 November 1688
- Created by: James II and VII
- Peerage: Scotland
- First holder: John Graham, 1st Viscount Dundee
- Last holder: David Graham, 3rd Viscount Dundee; James Graham, 6th Viscount (in pretence)
- Subsidiary titles: Lord of Claverhouse
- Status: Extinct
- Extinction date: 1690; 1759

Viscount Dundee was a title in the Peerage of Scotland. It was created on 12 November 1688 for John Graham with remainder to him and his heirs male of his body, which failing, to his other heirs male. He was made Lord Graham of Claverhouse at the same time, also in the Peerage of Scotland. The second Viscount died an infant in 1689. The title was forfeited by the third Viscount in 1690, but continued to be used by the heirs-male, also Jacobites, into the next century.

== Viscounts Dundee (1688) ==
- John Graham, 1st Viscount Dundee (d. 1689)
- James Graham, 2nd Viscount Dundee (d. 1689), son of the preceding
- David Graham, 3rd Viscount Dundee (d. 1700), uncle of the preceding
- Heirs but for the attainder:
  - David Graham of Duntroon (d. 1706), did not use the title
  - William Graham, titular 5th Viscount (d. 1717), attainted for his part in the 'Fifteen
  - James Graham, titular 6th Viscount (d. 1759), took part in the 'Forty-Five
