= Henry Scrymgeour-Wedderburn, 11th Earl of Dundee =

British Conservative politician and journalist (1902–1983)

The Right Honourable The Earl of Dundee PC JP DL
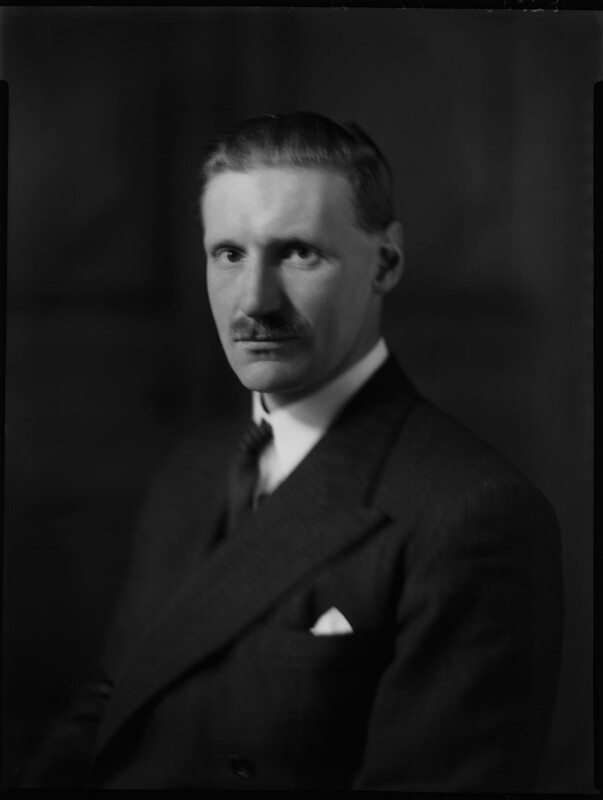
- Scrymgeour-Wedderburn in 1936

Minister of State for Foreign Affairs
- In office 9 October 1961 – 16 October 1964
- Monarch: Elizabeth II
- Prime Minister: Harold Macmillan; Alec Douglas-Home
- Preceded by: Joseph Godber
- Succeeded by: Peter Thomas

Minister without portfolio
- In office 23 October 1958 – 9 October 1961
- Monarch: Elizabeth II
- Prime Minister: Harold Macmillan
- Preceded by: The Lord Mancroft
- Succeeded by: The Lord Mills

Parliamentary Under-Secretary of State for Scotland
- In office 8 February 1941 – 4 March 1942
- Monarch: George VI
- Prime Minister: Winston Churchill
- Preceded by: Joseph Westwood
- Succeeded by: Allan Chapman

Member of the House of Lords Lord Temporal
- In office 30 July 1954 – 29 June 1983; Hereditary Peerage
- Preceded by: Peerage created as Baron Glassary
- Succeeded by: The 12th Earl of Dundee

Member of Parliament for West Renfrewshire
- In office 27 October 1931 – 15 June 1945
- Preceded by: Robert Forgan
- Succeeded by: Thomas Scollan

Personal details
- Born: 3 May 1902
- Died: 29 June 1983 (aged 81)
- Party: Conservative
- Spouse: Patricia Katherine Montagu Douglas Scott (m. 1946)
- Children: Alexander Scrymgeour, 12th Earl of Dundee

Henry James Scrymgeour-Wedderburn, 11th Earl of Dundee PC, JP, DL (3 May 1902 – 29 June 1983), was a Scottish nobleman, soldier and politician.

== Background and education ==
Dundee was the elder son of Colonel Henry Scrymgeour-Wedderburn, de jure 10th Earl of Dundee, and Edith, daughter of John Moffat. He was educated at Winchester and Balliol College, Oxford, where he was president of the Oxford Union in October 1924. He graduated with a Master of Arts degree in 1926.

== Political career ==
After leaving Oxford, he joined the Territorial Army on 8 April 1927, as a second lieutenant in the 6th/7th Battalion of the Black Watch. Wedderburn was elected Unionist Member of Parliament (MP) for West Renfrewshire from 1931 until 1945. He was appointed to be PPS to the President of Eden's board for two years before moving to the Ministry of Agriculture. In 1935, he was PPS to the Secretary of State for Scotland before being promoted as Under-Secretary of State for Scotland until the outbreak of the war. He served in the Second World War as an officer with the 7th Battalion, The Black Watch from 1939 to 1941, leaving with the rank of captain.

Scrymgeour-Wedderburn was wounded so returned to London politics. He was briefly Joint Under-Secretary of State for Scotland from 1941 to 1942. He was chosen as a member of the parliamentary delegation to China just as Japanese soldiers stormed Singapore. The delegates promised to offer the Chinese military support in a broader alliance to fight the occupation of Manchuria.

On 31 July 1952, the Scrymgeour family's claim to title of Dudhope and Scrymgeour in the Scottish peerage was accepted by the Lords Committee for Privileges; and again on 18 May 1953 his claim to the earldom of Dundee and Lord Innerkeithing was affirmed. On 30 July 1954, he was created Baron Glassary, of Glassary in the County of Argyll, in the Peerage of the United Kingdom, giving him an automatic seat in the House of Lords (not guaranteed by his Scottish peerages).

Macmillan chose Dundee minister without portfolio from 1958 to 1961 owing to a wealth of experiences at home and abroad. Dundee was successfully promoted to number two in the Foreign Office as Minister of State for Foreign Affairs from 1961 to 1964. Simultaneously he was Assistant Deputy Leader of the House of Lords from 1960 to 1962 and Deputy Leader of the House of Lords from 1962 to 1964. In 1959, he was appointed a Privy Counsellor. He also served as the first Chairman of Scotland's Historic Buildings Council, from 1953 to 1958.

Lord Dundee was also the Hereditary Royal Standard-Bearer for Scotland, a right established by his father before the Court of Claims in 1902. He was decorated with the award of Order of the Brilliant Star of China (with Special Cravat). He was awarded an honorary LLD by St Andrews University in 1954.

== Family ==
Lord Dundee married his brother's widow, Patricia Katherine Montagu Douglas Scott, granddaughter of William Montagu Douglas Scott, 6th Duke of Buccleuch, on 30 October 1946. She was in fact the widow of not one but two soldiers, both of whom were killed in action: Lt.-Col. Walter Douglas Faulkner MC of the Irish Guards (k. May 1940), and Lord Dundee's younger brother David Scrymgeour-Wedderburn DSO of the Scots Guards (1912–1944), with each of whom she had two children.

Lord and Lady Dundee had one child together:

- Alexander Henry Scrymgeour of Dundee, later 12th Earl of Dundee (born 5 June 1949).

Lady Dundee died on 3 December 2012 at the age of 102.

His stepdaughter and niece Elizabeth married John Roper-Curzon, 20th Baron Teynham.

Parliament of the United Kingdom
| Preceded by Robert Forgan | Member of Parliament for West Renfrewshire; 1931–1945 | Succeeded by Thomas Scollan |
Peerage of Scotland
| Vacant Title dormant | Earl of Dundee; 1953–1983 | Succeeded by Alexander Scrymgeour |
| Vacant Title dormant | Viscount Dudhope; 1952–1983 | Succeeded by Alexander Scrymgeour |
Peerage of the United Kingdom
| New creation | Baron Glassary; 1954–1983 | Succeeded by Alexander Scrymgeour |
