= Bearer of the Royal Banner =

The Royal Banner of Scotland

The Bearer of the Royal Banner is one of the Great Officers of the Royal Household in Scotland. The bearer participates in royal, state, and other ceremonial events when needed.

In 1298, Alexander Scrymgeour was granted the office of Constable of Dundee for the feudal service (grand sergeanty) of carrying the royal banner in the army of Scotland, and in 1324 Robert I granted Alexander's son, Nicholas Scrymgeour, and his heirs the heritable office of Banner-Bearer. His descendants retained the office until the death in 1668 of John Scrymgeour, Earl of Dundee, whose estates and heritable offices, deemed to have fallen to the king as ultimus haeres, were regranted to Charles Maitland, later 3rd Earl of Lauderdale. In 1821 the 8th Earl officiated at the coronation of George IV, but in the following year Henry Scrymgeour-Wedderburn carried the royal banner at Holyroodhouse during the King's visit. The respective rights of the Earls of Lauderdale and the Scrymgeour-Wedderburns, as representatives of the Scrymgeours, remained unresolved until 1902 when in view of the forthcoming coronation the Court of Claims found in favour of Henry Scrymgeour-Wedderburn. Henry's son proved his claim as heir to the Viscountcy of Dudhope in 1952 and the Earldom of Dundee in 1953.

The Earl of Lauderdale holds the separate office of Bearer of the National Flag of Scotland.

== See also ==
- Standard-bearer
- Standard Bearer of England

== Sources ==
Stair Memorial Encyclopaedia of the Laws of Scotland, vol.7 "The Crown", para 825.
