= Royal Banner of Scotland =

Banner design used in Scotland

Royal Banner of the Royal Arms of Scotland
- Lion Rampant of Scotland; Royal Banner of Scotland; Royal Standard of Scotland; Banner of the King of Scots
- Proportion: House banner is 5:4 ratio Mass-produced versions tend towards 1:2 or 2:3 (3:5 shown)
- Adopted: 13th century
- Design: Red (Gules) lion rampant with blue (Azure) claws and tongue, within a red double border having a motif of alternating heraldic lilies, on a yellow (Or) field.

The Royal Banner of the Royal Arms of Scotland, also known as the Royal Banner of Scotland, or more commonly the Lion Rampant of Scotland, and historically as the Royal Standard of Scotland, (Scottish Gaelic: Bratach rìoghail na h-Alba, Scots: Ryal banner o Scotland) or Banner of the King of Scots, is the royal banner of Scotland, and historically, the royal standard of the Kingdom of Scotland. Used historically by the Scottish monarchs, the banner differs from Scotland's national flag, the Saltire, in that its official use is restricted by an Act of the Parliament of Scotland to only a few Great Officers of State who officially represent the Monarchy in Scotland. It is also used in an official capacity at royal residences in Scotland when the Head of State is not present.

The earliest recorded use of the Lion Rampant as a royal emblem in Scotland was by Alexander II in 1222; with the additional embellishment of a double border set with lilies occurring during the reign of Alexander III (1249–1286). This emblem occupied the shield of the royal coat of arms of the ancient Kingdom of Scotland which, together with a royal banner displaying the same, was used by the King of Scots until the Union of the Crowns in 1603, when James VI acceded to the thrones of the kingdoms of England and Ireland. Since 1603, the lion rampant of Scotland has been incorporated into both the royal arms and royal banners of successive Scottish then British monarchs in order to symbolise Scotland, as can be seen today in the Royal Standard of the United Kingdom. Although now officially restricted to use by representatives of the Monarch and at royal residences, the Royal Banner continues to be one of Scotland's most recognisable symbols.

== Design ==
Displaying a red lion rampant, with blue tongue and claws, within a red double border on a yellow background, the design of the Royal Banner of Scotland is formally specified in heraldry as: Or, a lion rampant Gules armed and langued Azure within a double tressure flory counter-flory of the second, meaning: A gold (Or) background, whose principal symbol is a red (Gules) upright lion (lion rampant) with blue (Azure) claws and tongue (armed and langued), surrounded by a two-lined border (tressure) decorated with opposing pairs of floral symbols (flory counter-flory) of the second colour specified in the blazon (Gules). Used as a house flag, its proportions are 5:4; however, flag manufacturers themselves may also adopt alternative ratios, including 1:2 or 2:3.

== History ==
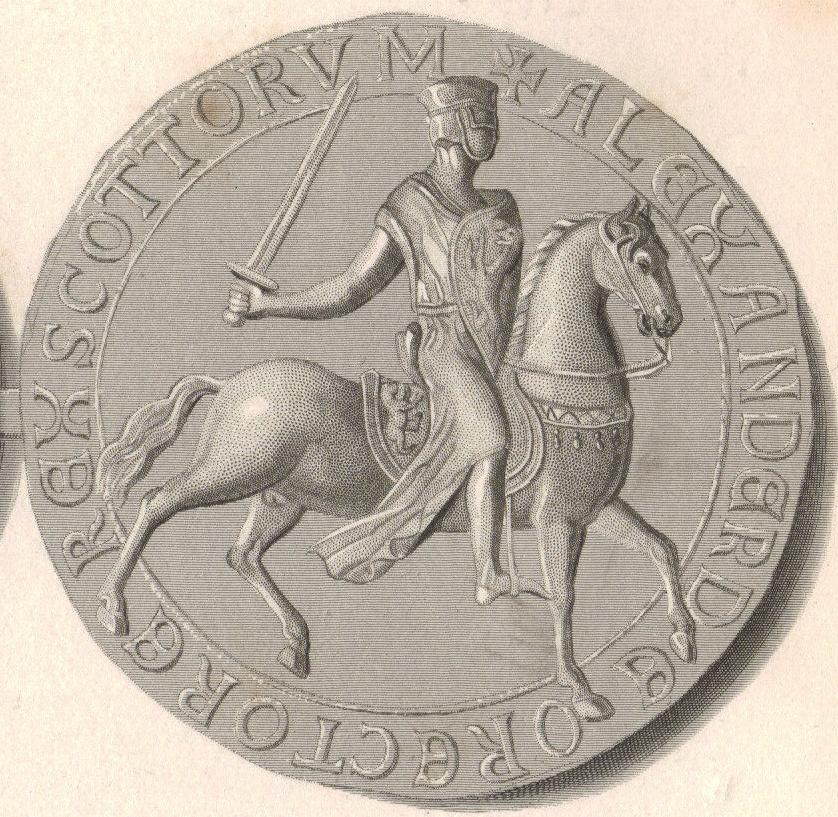
Reverse of Alexander II's Great Seal; Lion rampant on saddle and shield.

The Lion rampant has been used as a heraldic symbol by heirs of Malcolm III beginning with David I. The Great Seal was used by Alexander II (1214–1249). Its use in Scotland originated during the reign of Malcolm III (1058–1093), The Lion rampant motif is used as a badge by those Irish clans that have lineage in common with Malcolm III. They are linked to the legendary Milesian genealogies (specifically, the red lion is associated with the descendants of Érimón). An early recorded Scottish royal standard featured a dragon, which was used at the Battle of the Standard in 1138 by David I (1124–1153). Robert the Bruce, King Robert I, almost certainly wore a yellow surcoat that bore the Royal Red Lion Rampant at the Battle of Bannockburn in 1314.

Following the Union of the Crowns of England, Ireland and Scotland in 1603, the Royal Banner of the arms of the kings of Scotland was incorporated into the royal standards of successive Scottish then, following the Acts of Union in 1707, British monarchs; with all such royal standards being quartered to include the banner of the arms of each individual realm. Since 1603, the Royal Banner of Scotland has appeared in both the first and fourth quarters of the quartered royal standard used in Scotland, while appearing only in the second quarter of that version used elsewhere.

== Protocol ==
=== Use at royal residences ===
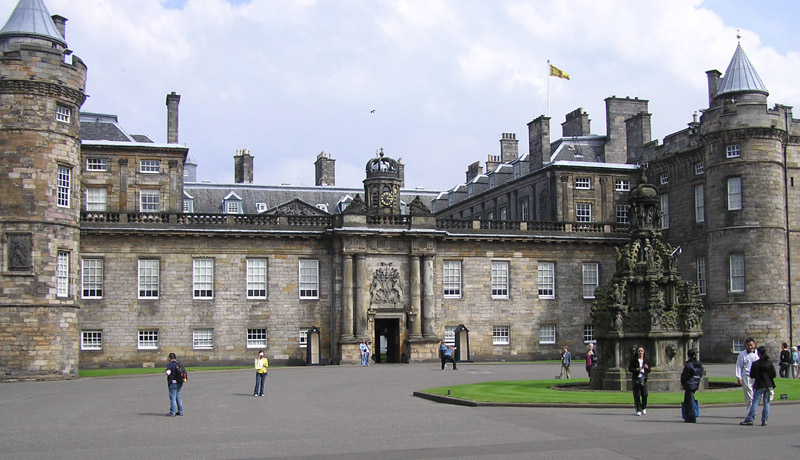
The Royal Banner of Scotland, flying over Holyrood Palace, Edinburgh.

The Royal Banner of Scotland is used officially at the Scottish royal residences of the Palace of Holyroodhouse, Edinburgh, and Balmoral Castle, Aberdeenshire, when the King is not in residence. The Royal Standard of the United Kingdom used in Scotland is flown when the Monarch is present.

=== Use by representatives of the Monarchy ===
In the tradition of Scottish heraldry, use of the banner is not restricted to the monarch. Several Great Officers of State who officially represent the Monarchy in Scotland are permitted to use the Royal Banner of Scotland, including the First Minister of Scotland (as Keeper of the Great Seal of Scotland), Lord Lieutenants within their respective Lieutenancies, the Lord High Commissioner to the General Assembly of the Church of Scotland, the Lord Lyon King of Arms and other lieutenants who may be specially appointed by the Head of State.

=== Use by the Heir Apparent ===
A variation of the Royal Banner of Scotland is used by the heir apparent to the monarch, the Duke of Rothesay, whose standard is the banner defaced with an Azure coloured plain label of three points. The personal banner of Charles III, prior to his accession to the throne, also featured the same, displayed upon an inner shield.

=== Legal status ===
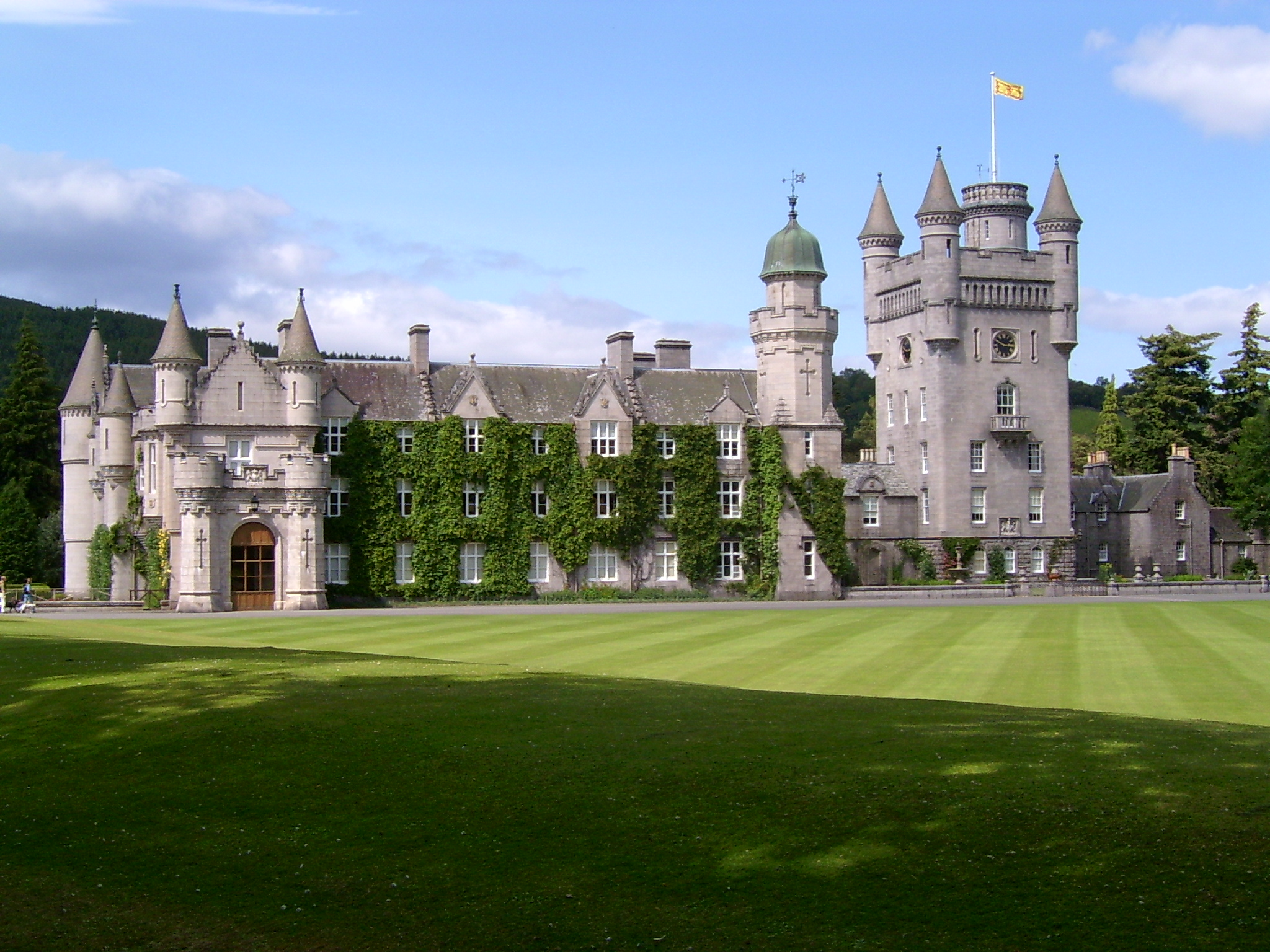
The Royal Banner of Scotland, flying over Balmoral Castle, Aberdeenshire.

As the personal banner of the Monarch, use of the Royal Banner of Scotland is restricted under the Act of the Parliament of Scotland 1672 cap. 47 and the Lyon King of Arms Act 1867 (30 & 31 Vict. c. 17), and any unauthorised use of such is an offence under the Act. In 1978, a St Albans linen merchant, Denis Pamphilon, was fined £100 daily for usurpation of the banner on decorative bedspreads until he desisted, and both Rangers F.C. and the Scottish National Party have been admonished by the Court of the Lord Lyon for their non-authorised use of the banner. Despite such action, the flag continues to feature on a variety of merchandise and souvenirs produced commercially for Scotland's economically important tourism industry.

In 1934, George V issued a royal warrant authorising use of the Royal Banner of Scotland during the Silver Jubilee celebrations, due to take place the following year. However, such use was restricted to hand-held flags for "decorative ebullition" as a mark of loyalty to the Monarch; the banner was not to be flown from flagpoles or public buildings. The use of hand-held flags at state occasions, such as the opening of the Scottish Parliament, and at sporting events, continues to be authorised by this Royal Warrant although according to former Lord Lyon Robin Blair in an interview given to the Sunday Post in November 2007, such use at sporting events "was not envisaged in 1935".

== Appearance in other royal flags ==
As well as forming the basis of the standard of the Duke of Rothesay, the Royal Banner of Scotland has since 1603 been a component of what is now styled the Royal Standard of the United Kingdom, both for the version used exclusively in Scotland and the one used elsewhere. It similarly appears in the Royal standards of Canada, with the arms of Canada reflecting the royal symbols of England, Scotland, Ireland and France.

The Standard of the Duke of Rothesay, viz the Royal Banner of Scotland defaced with a plain label of three points Azure.

The Royal Standard of the United Kingdom used in Scotland, featuring the Royal Banner of Scotland in the first and fourth quarters.

The Royal Standard of the United Kingdom used beyond Scotland, featuring the Royal Banner of Scotland in the second quarter.

The Sovereign’s Flag for Canada: a field quartered by the royal banners of England, Scotland, Ireland and France. The base shows a sprig of three red maple leaves.

=== Gallery ===
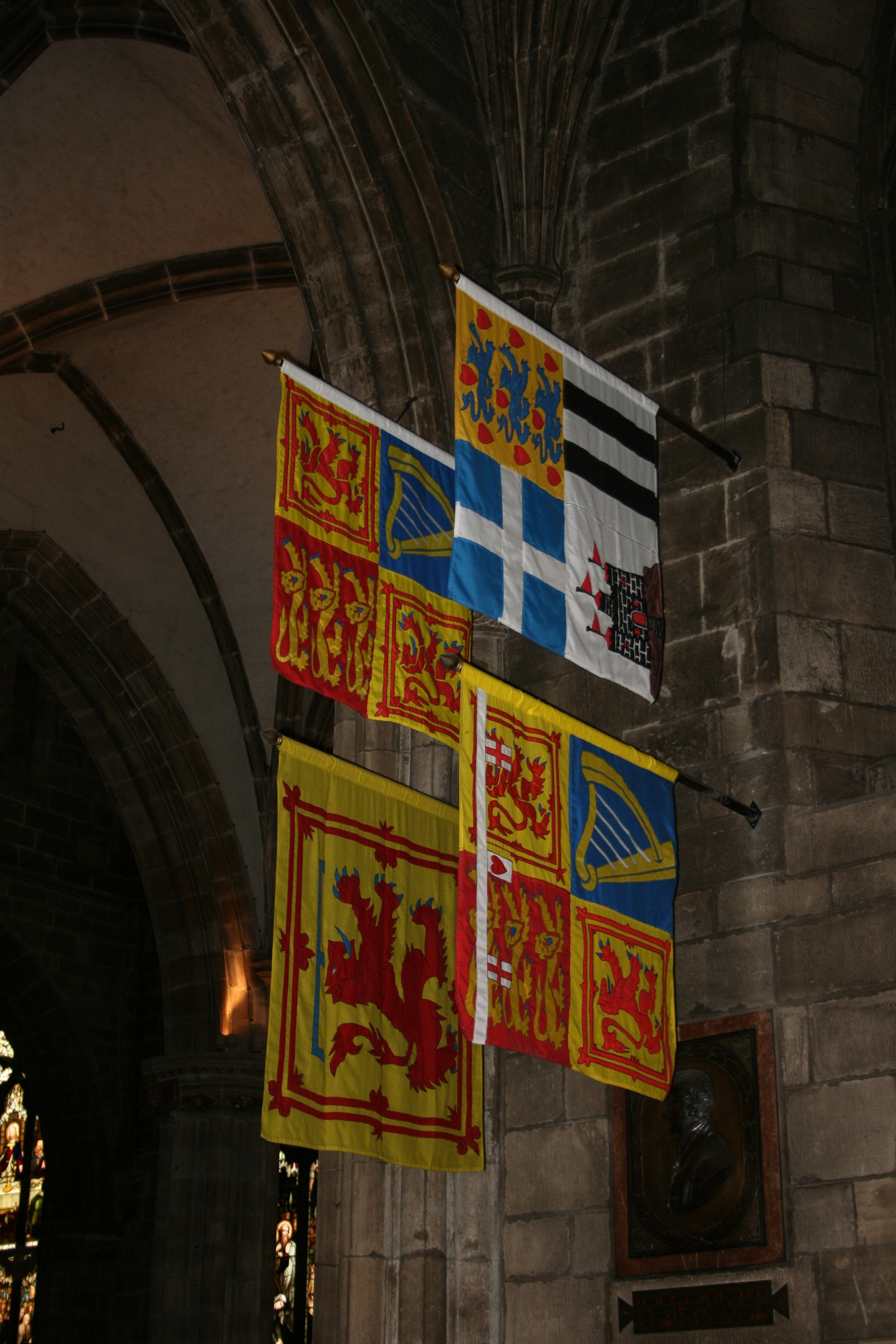
The Royal Standard of the United Kingdom (Scottish variant) and (clockwise) those of the Prince Philip, the Princess Royal (Scottish variant) and the Duke of Rothesay, displayed in St Giles's Cathedral.

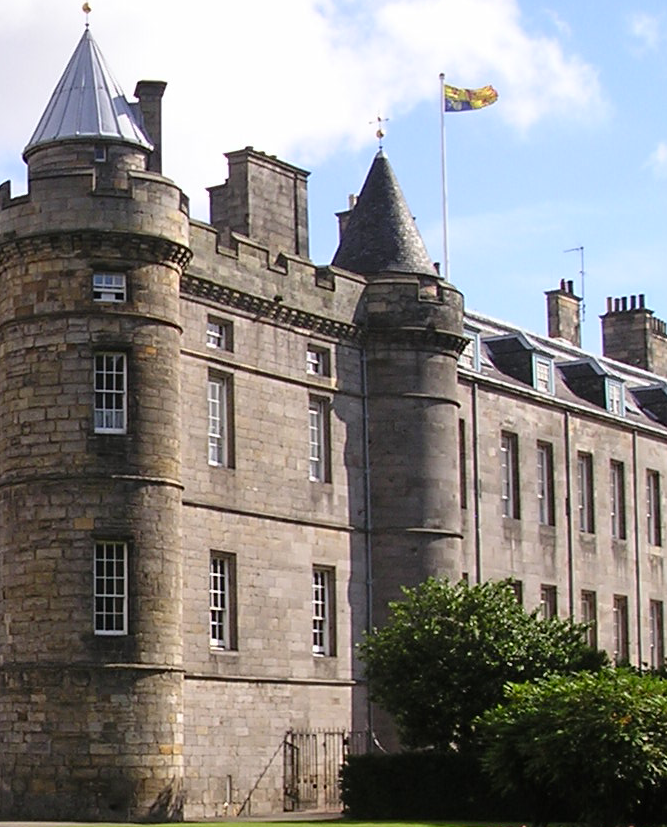
The Royal Standard of the United Kingdom, (Scottish variant), featuring the Royal Banner of Scotland in the first and fourth quarters, flying over Holyrood Palace, Edinburgh.

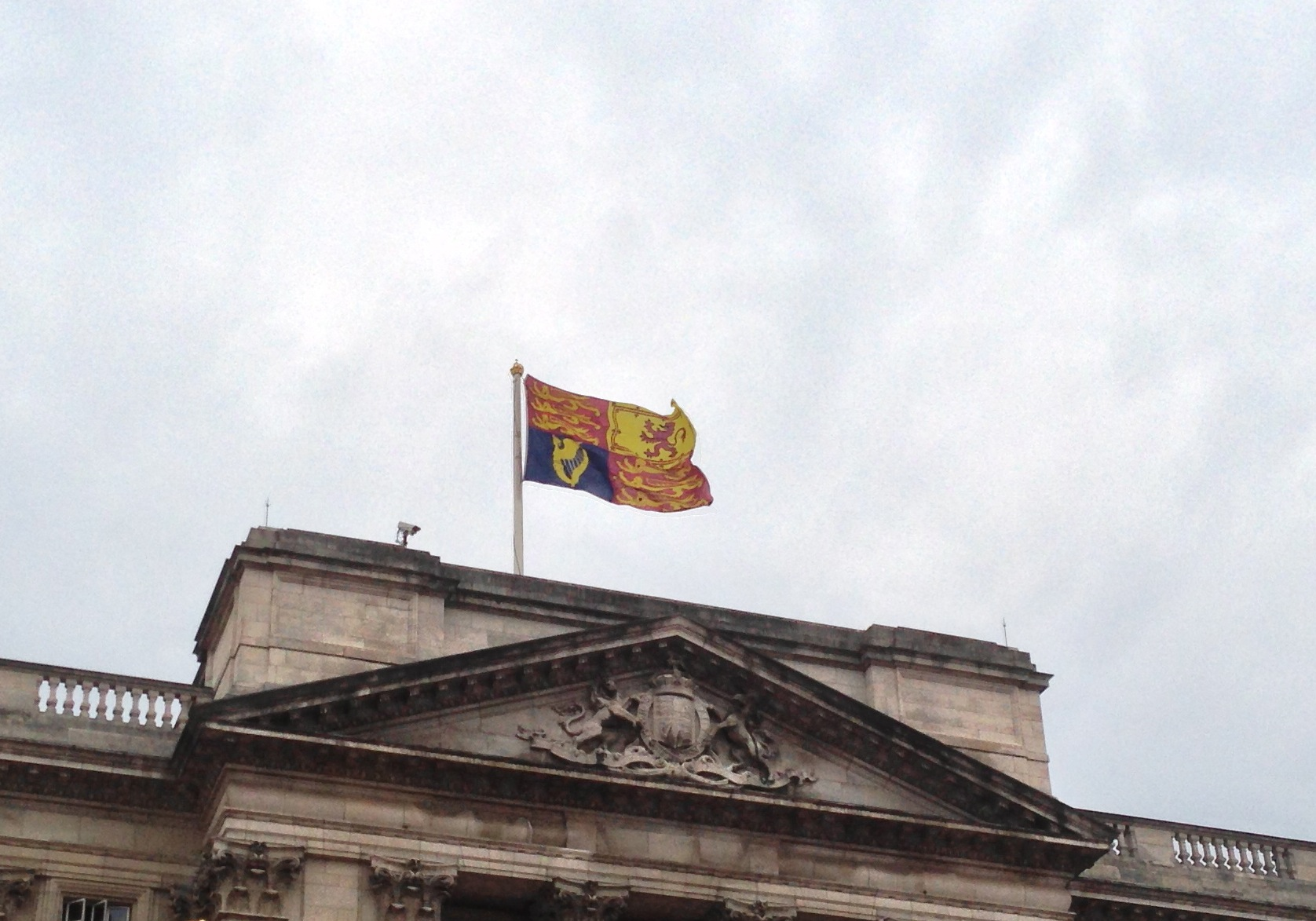
The Royal Standard of the United Kingdom used outside of Scotland, featuring the Royal Banner of Scotland in the second quarter, flying over Buckingham Palace, London.

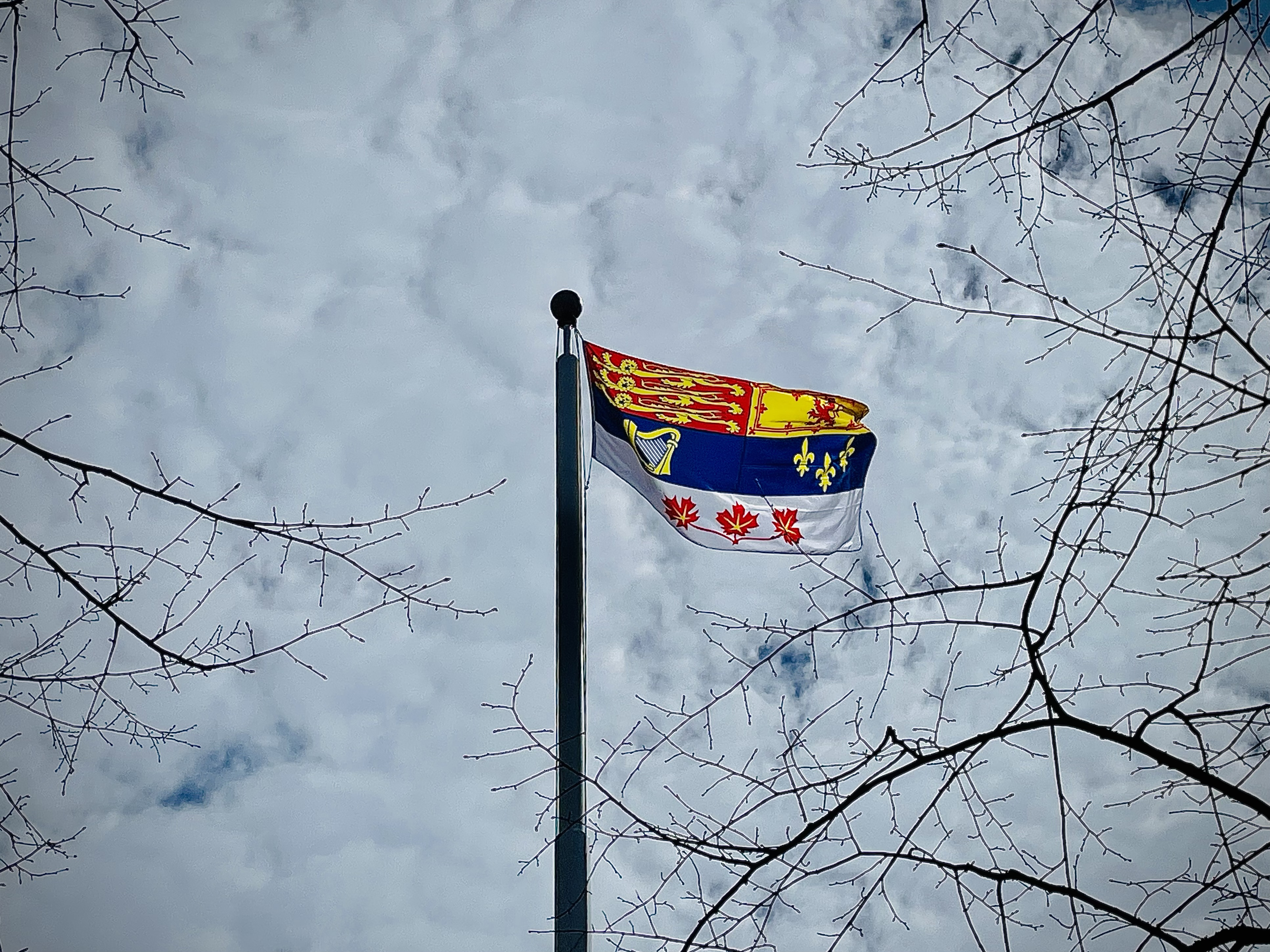
The Sovereign's Flag of Canada flies outside Government House in Halifax on the Coronation of Charles III. The Royal Banner of Scotland features in the quartered coat displayed in the upper divisions.

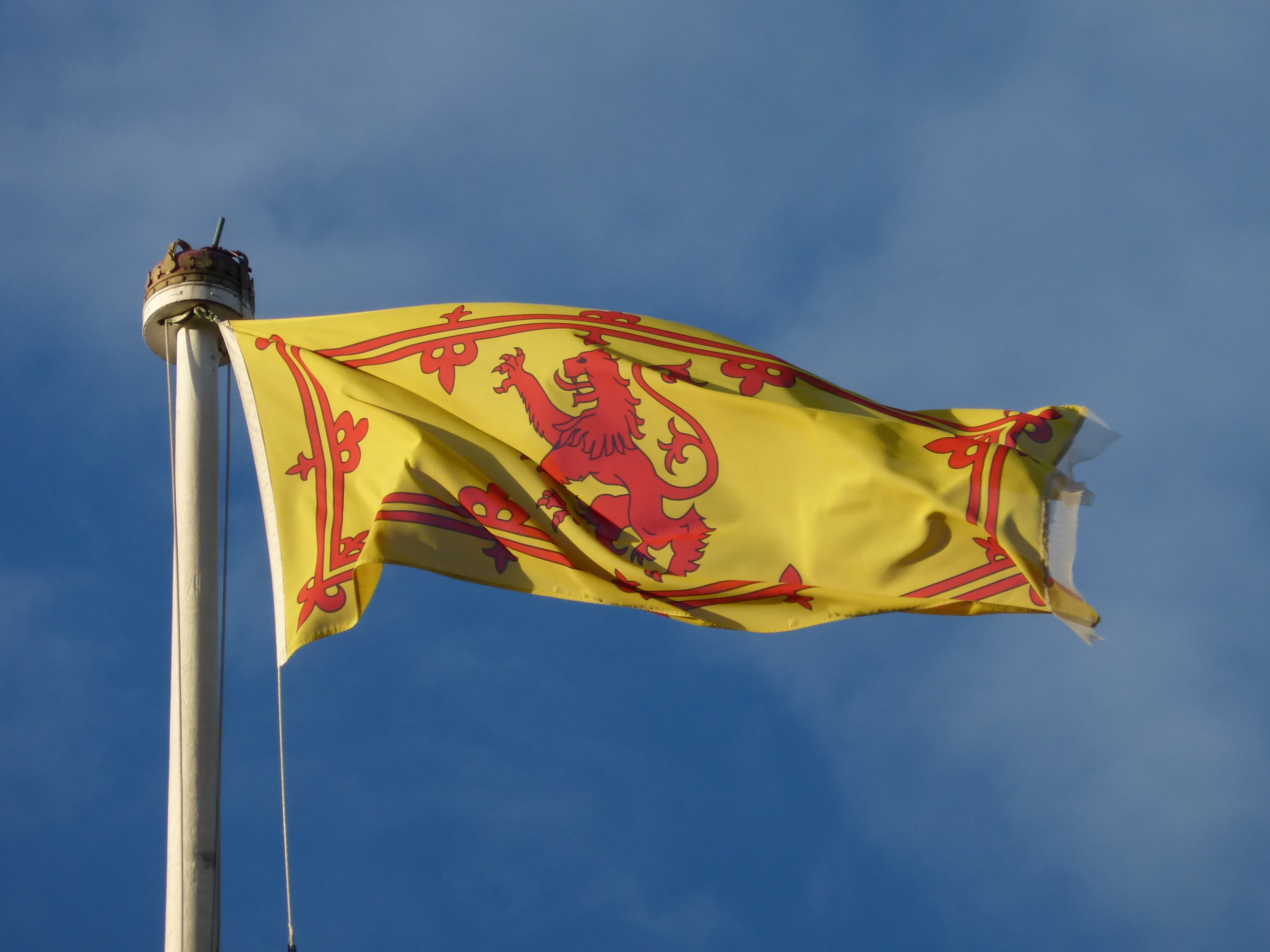
The Royal Banner of Scotland flying from a flagpole with a representation of the Crown of Scotland forming the finial.

== National Flag of Scotland ==
The Saltire

The Flag of Scotland, also known as the Saint Andrew's Cross or more commonly The Saltire, is the national flag of Scotland. It is also, where possible, flown from Scottish Government buildings every day from 8am until sunset, with certain exceptions, for example, on United Kingdom National Days.

== See also ==
- Hereditary Bearer of the Royal Banner
- Royal coat of arms of Scotland
- Royal coat of arms of the United Kingdom
- Royal Standard of the United Kingdom
- Arms of Canada
- Royal Standard of Canada
- List of Scottish flags
- List of British flags
- Scottish heraldry
- Duke of Rothesay
- List of Scottish monarchs
