= Ian Maitland =

Ian Maitland may refer to:

- Ian Maitland, 18th Earl of Lauderdale (born 1937)
- Ian Maitland, 15th Earl of Lauderdale (1891–1953)
- Ian Maitland (academic)
