= Greystones Lifeboat Station =

Former RNLI lifeboat station in County Wicklow, Ireland

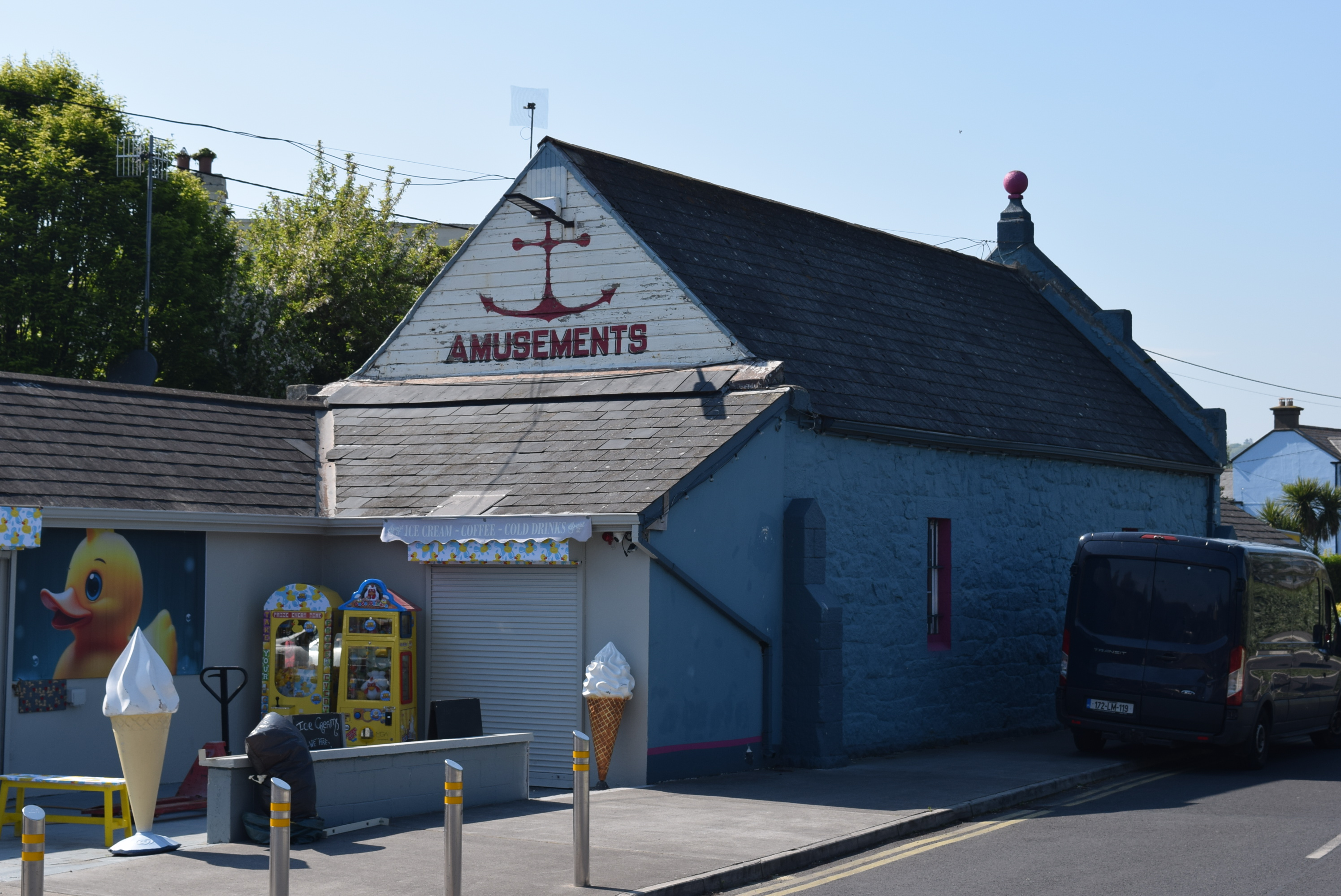
- Former RNLI Lifeboat Station, Greystones, Co. Wicklow

- Greystones, County Wicklow

General information
- Status: Closed
- Type: RNLI Lifeboat Station
- Location: Beach Road, Rathdown Lower, Greystones, County Wicklow, A63 V267, Ireland
- Coordinates: 53°09′01.3″N 6°04′00.0″W
- Opened: 1872
- Closed: 1895

Greystones Lifeboat Station was located near Greystones Harbour, on what is now Beach Road, in Greystones, a town and seaside resort sitting mid-way between Dún Laoghaire and Wicklow, approximately 27 km (17 mi) south of Dublin, in County Wicklow, on the east coast of Ireland.

A lifeboat station was first established at Greystones in 1872 by the Royal National Lifeboat Institution (RNLI).

After just 23 years in operation, Greystones Lifeboat Station was closed in 1895.

== History ==
After representation from local residents, and with consideration to the report by the Inspector of Lifeboats after a visit to the town, at a meeting of the RNLI committee of management on Thursday 7 September 1871, it was decided to establish a lifeboat station at Greystones in County Wicklow, "as it was thought that such a boat might occasionally be of service there, looking to the long distance between the Kingstown and Wicklow Life-boat stations, and this being the most convenient intermediate point."

The sum of £1000 had been left to the Institution by the late James Joseph Tancred of 'Pearville', 114 Rathgar Road, Rathgar, Dublin, for the provision of a lifeboat on the Irish coast, and this sum was appropriated to the station, with a lifeboat to be named after his late wife.

A 33-foot self-righting 'Pulling and Sailing' (P&S) lifeboat, one with sails and (10) oars, along with its launching carriage, was despatched to the new station in July 1872, transported to Dublin free of charge by the British and Irish Steam Packet Company. A lifeboat house had been constructed by Mr T. Connolly at Greystones at a cost of £216-5s, on a site granted by William La Touche, JP,

On 3 August 1872, the lifeboat was drawn in procession on its carriage by a team of six horses, from the railway station, through the town, to the beach, where it was formally presented to the local lifeboat committee. Prayers were said by the Rev. Lewis H. Streane, M.A., Rector of Delgany, after which the boat was officially named Sarah Tancred by Lady Meath. Then lifeboat was then launched for a demonstration, watched on by a large crowd of spectators.

During her 14-years on service at Greystones, the Sarah Tancred was launched just four times, and saved four lives. On 17 May 1873, "the Captain, two friends, and a seaman" were rescued from the yacht Nacomi, in trouble off Bray Head. The survivors were landed at Wicklow.

In 1886, a replacement lifeboat was sent to Greystones. The larger 37-foot self-righting lifeboat, carriage and equipment was funded from the gift of Mrs Anne Browne of Monkstown in memory of her late husband, Richard Frederick Browne. At a ceremony and launching on 2 December 1886, the lifeboat was named Richard Brown (ON 98) by Mrs La Touche, on behalf of the donor.

On 14 December 1892, lifeboat coxswain John Doyle, along with two members of his family, William Doyle and his son Henry, both thought to members of the Greystones lifeboat crew, were attempting to assist the schooner Mersey, which was in danger of breaking her moorings at Greystones harbour. All three perished when they were washed off the harbour wall by a huge wave.

The Richard Brown was never called on service in nine years on station, and in 1895, Greystones Lifeboat Station was closed. Unusually, at only nine-years-old, the lifeboat was not transferred elsewhere, but was broken up. The station building still stands, and is currently under renovation (May 2025).

The crew of the Wicklow lifeboat attended a ceremony in Greystones on 18 Aug 2013, when a commemorative plaque in memory of John Doyle, was unveiled by Mrs Betty Lowe, his granddaughter.

== Roll of honour ==
In memory of those lost whilst serving Greystones lifeboat.

- Drowned when washed off the harbour wall, whilst assisting the schooner Mersey, 14 Oct 1892

John Doyle, Coxswain
William Doyle
Henry Doyle

== Greystones lifeboats ==
ON (Note: ON is the RNLI's Official Number of the boat.)	Name	Built	On station	Class	Comments
Pre-566	Sarah Tancred	1872	1872–1886	33-foot Peake Self-righting (P&S)	(Note: 33-foot x 8-foot (10-oared) Peake-class self-righting (P&S) lifeboat, gift of Mr J. J. Tancred of Rathgar, Dublin, built by Woolfe of Shadwell, London, costing £285.)
98	Richard Brown	1886	1886–1895	37-foot Self-righting (P&S)	(Note: 37-foot x 8-foot (12-oared) self-righting (P&S) lifeboat, gift of Mrs R. F. Brown of Monkstown, Dublin, built by Forrestt of Limehouse, London, costing £374.)

Station Closed, 1895

Pre ON numbers are unofficial numbers used by the Lifeboat Enthusiast Society to reference early lifeboats not included on the official RNLI list.
ON 98 - All RNLI references indicate the lifeboat name as Richard Brown, and the donor as Mrs R. F. (Anne) Browne

== See also ==
- List of RNLI stations
- List of former RNLI stations
- Royal National Lifeboat Institution lifeboats
