= Reginald Brabazon, 12th Earl of Meath =

Irish politician and philanthropist (1841–1929)

The Right Honourable The Earl of Meath KP GCVO GBE GCStJ PC (Ire)
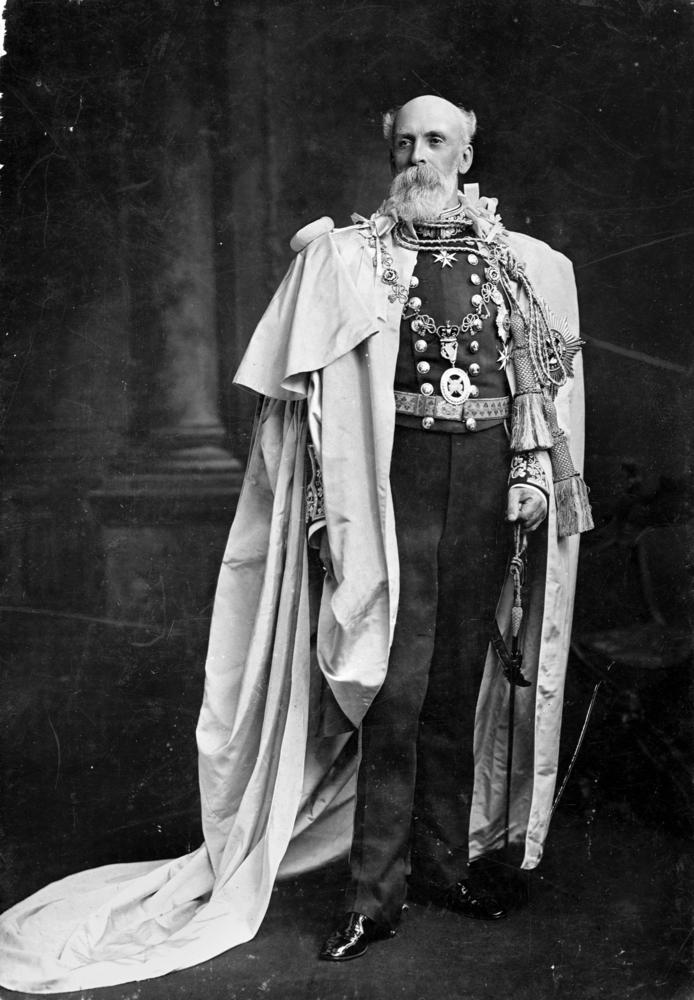
- The Earl of Meath, 1908
- Born: The Hon Reginald Brabazon; 31 July 1841; London, England
- Died: 11 October 1929 (aged 88)
- Other name: Baron Chaworth
- Occupations: Politician, philanthropist

Reginald Brabazon, 12th Earl of Meath (31 July 1841 – 11 October 1929) was an Irish politician and philanthropist.

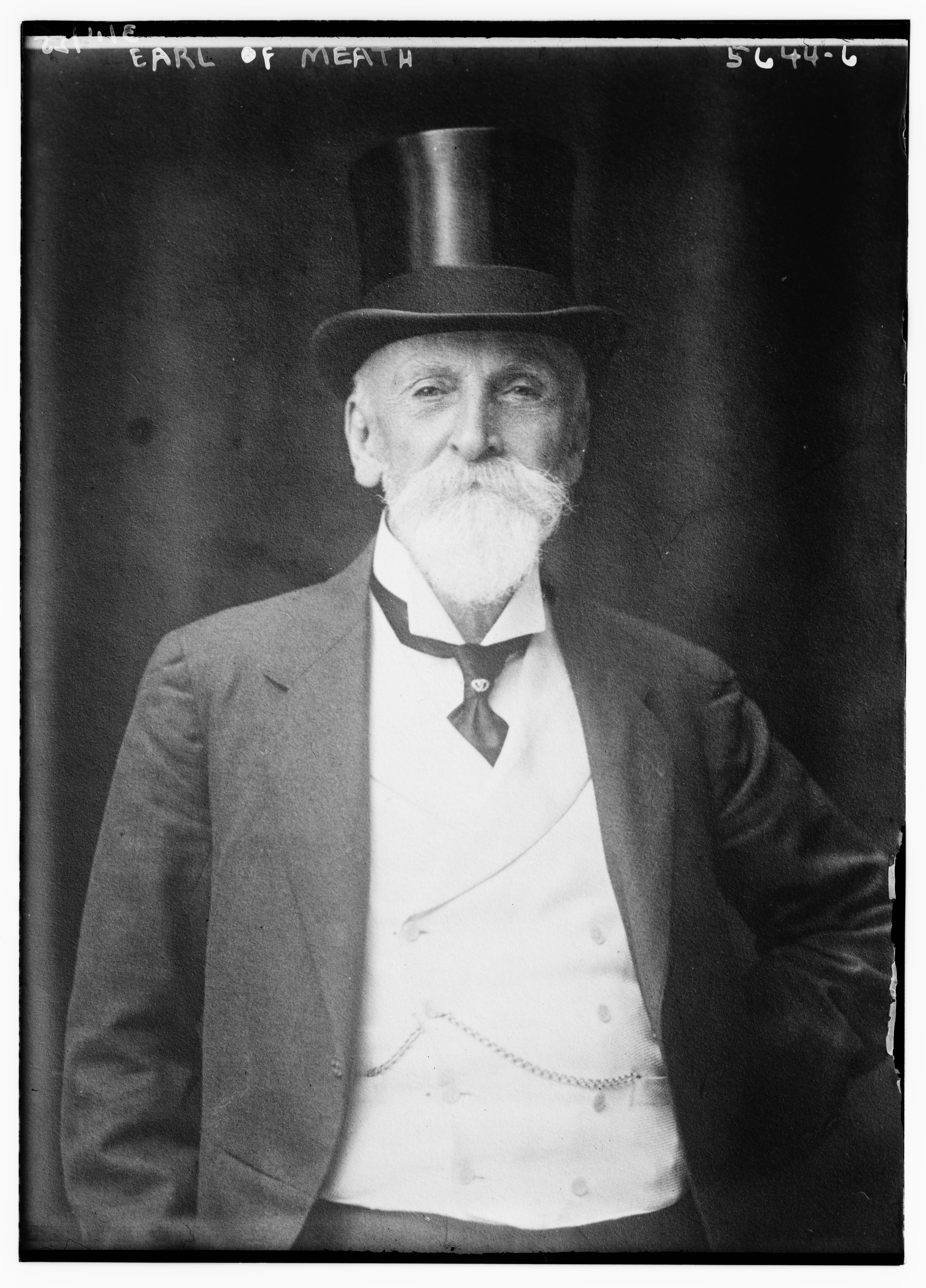
The Earl of Meath, photographed by the Bain News Service in 1900.

== Life ==
Reginald Brabazon was born into an old Anglo-Irish family in London, the second son of William Brabazon, 11th Earl of Meath and Harriot Brooke. When his father succeeded to the Earldom in 1851, Reginald, now the heir (his elder brother, Jacques, died of diphtheria in 1844), was styled Lord Brabazon. He was educated at Eton College and in 1863 he became a clerk in the Foreign Office.

In 1868 he married Lady Mary Jane Maitland, daughter of the 11th Earl of Lauderdale. Brabazon served as a diplomat abroad but he refused to go to Athens in 1873 to please his in-laws. He was given no alternative posting and while still suspended he resigned in 1877. He and his wife did not need to work so they decided to deal with "social problems and the relief of human suffering". His charities included the Metropolitan Public Gardens Association which he founded in 1882. The association created public parks and gardens in London. The Earl and his wife leased Ottershaw Park from 1882 to November 1883 from Sir Edward Colebrooke. He was High Sheriff of Wicklow in 1883.

In May 1887, Brabazon succeeded his father as 12th Earl of Meath. Lord Meath was also a prominent Conservative politician in the House of Lords as Baron Chaworth, and an ardent imperialist, and was responsible for the introduction of Empire Day, which was recognised by the British government in 1916. He was a member of the London County Council, the Privy Council of Ireland and the Senate of Southern Ireland. He was a friend of Baden Powell and an early advocate of the Scout movement, giving Scouts extensive access to Kilruddery. He was Chief Scout Commissioner for Ireland and was awarded the Silver Wolf by the Scout Association in 1920.

He was lord lieutenant for the County and the City of Dublin from 12 May 1898 until 1922. In December 1902 he was appointed Chancellor of the Royal University of Ireland, serving as such until 1906.

Lord Meath was appointed Knight of the Order of St Patrick (KP) in 1902, Knight Grand Cross of the Order of the British Empire (GBE) in the 1920 civilian war honours, and Knight Grand Cross of the Royal Victorian Order (GCVO) in the 1923 Birthday Honours.

His younger daughter, Lady Violet Constance Maitland Brabazon (1886–1936), married the 4th Earl of Verulam.

There is a Portland stone memorial (executed by the artist Joseph Hermon Cawthra in 1934) in his honour, bearing a small portrait panel in bas-relief, outside the Columbia Hotel in Lancaster Gate, London W2. The Portland limestone of the monument has not fared well over the 90-odd years of acid rain that has fallen in London since its construction: a considerable amount of fine detail has been lost from the carving through chemical weathering and atmospheric pollution. This is particularly evident in the face of the figure of a naked boy seated on the summit of the monument and also in the four half-roundels indicating compass points, which feature very low-relief depictions of historic buildings. Some recordings exist of the Earl's voice, made in October 1910, in the form of three speeches on the Empire Movement.

Lord Meath is buried in the graveyard of the Church of Ireland parish church in the small village of Delgany, County Wicklow, Ireland, along with his wife and son. There are some streets and squares in The Coombe, Dublin, named in his honour: Reginald Street, Reginald Square and Brabazon Square. Meath Gardens in Bethnal Green, opened as a public park in 1894 through the efforts of the Metropolitan Public Gardens Association, is named in his honour.

== Gallery ==
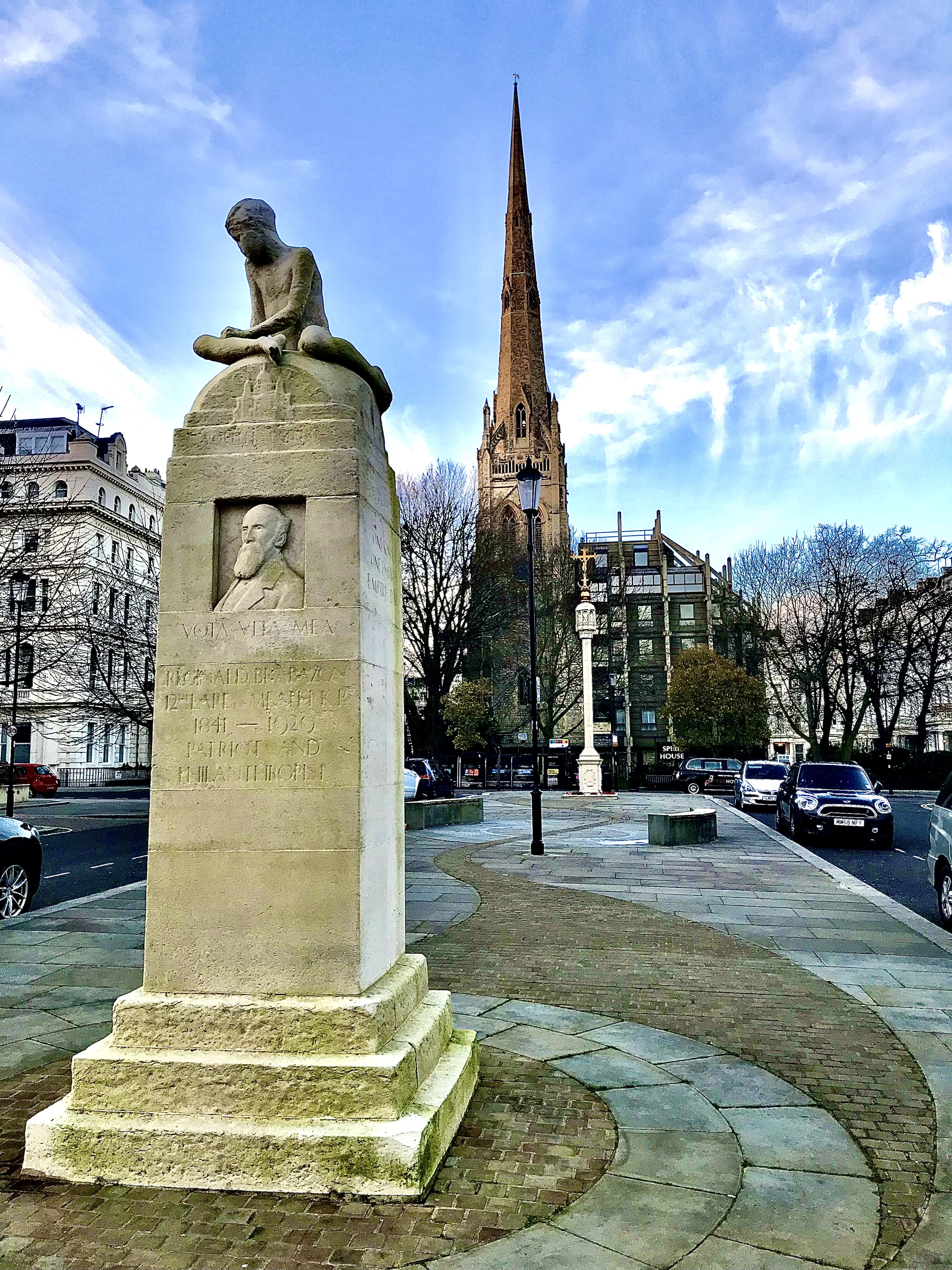
Memorial to Brabazon, unveiled 1934 (artist, Joseph Hermon Cawthra): South face (facing toward Kensington Gardens), bearing bas-relief portrait, in Lancaster Gate, London. Note chemical weathering by acid rain and green stains from algal growth

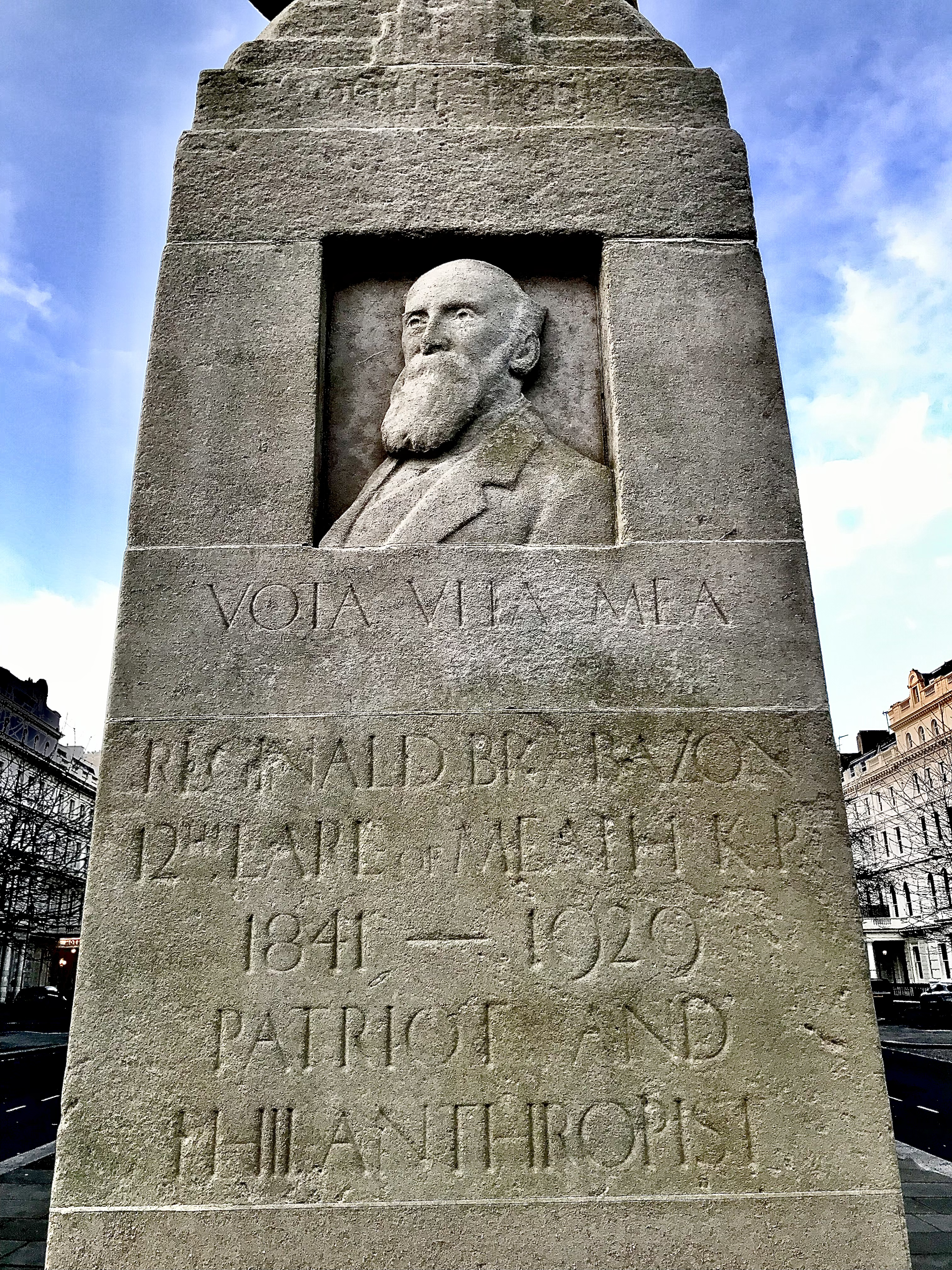
Detail of portrait relief and main inscription on South face of Meath memorial: "Vota vita mea (trans."The wishes of my life") - Reginald Brabazon, 12th Earl of Meath, KP,1841-1929, Patriot and Philanthropist"

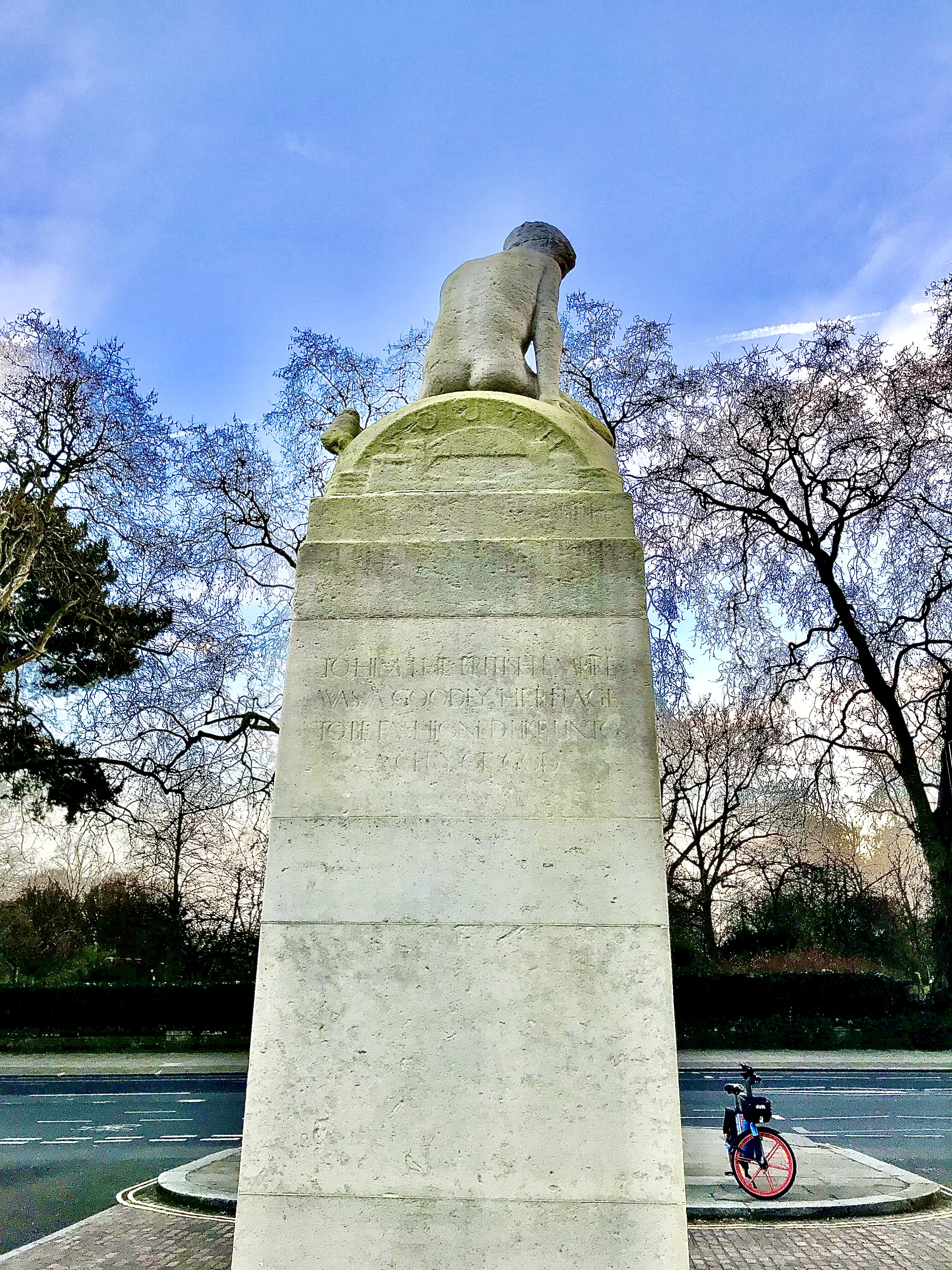
Back (North face) of Brabazon memorial, photographed February 5, 2023. The ardently imperialist inscription (growing faint from chemical weathering by acid rain) reads "To him the British Empire was a goodly heritage to be fashioned like unto a city of God"

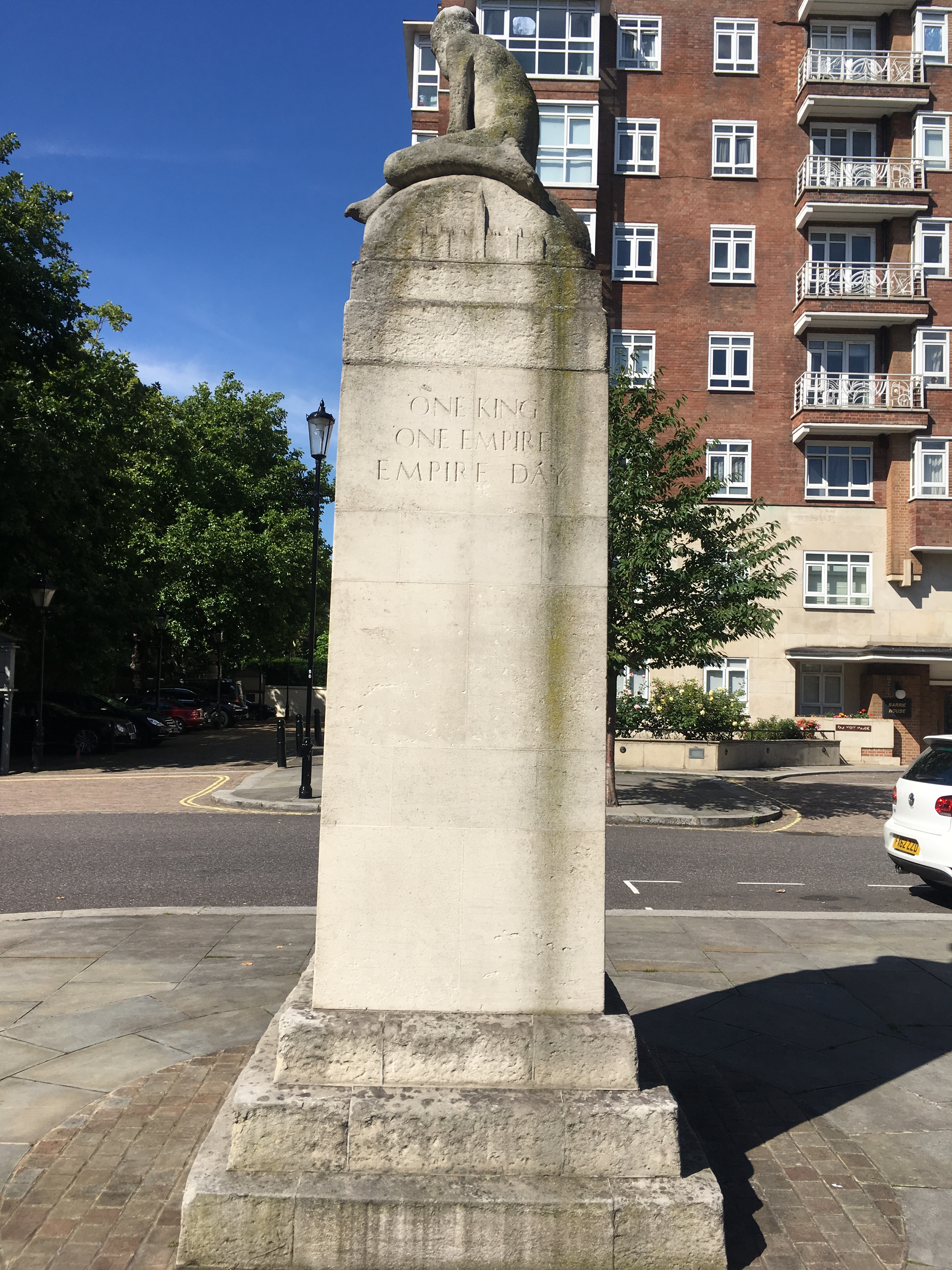
East face of memorial. Inscription reads "One King, One Empire, Empire Day". Trees of Kensington Gardens visible on the left

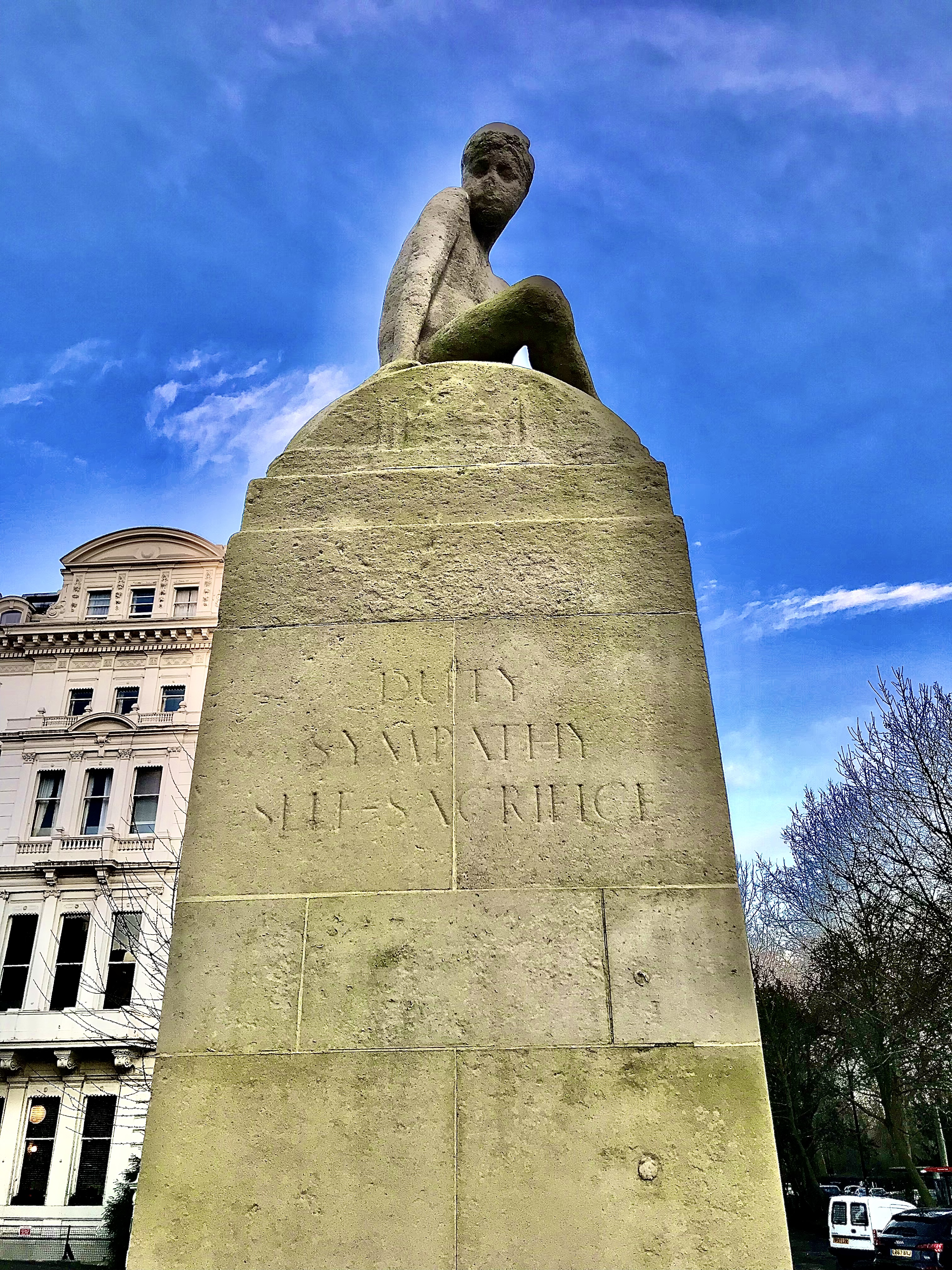
West face of memorial (viewer facing east).Inscription reads "Duty, Sympathy, Self-Sacrifice"

== Footnotes ==
Honorary titles
Preceded by Ion Hamilton, 1st Baron HolmPatrick	Lord Lieutenant of Dublin; 1898–1922	Succeeded by abolished
Peerage of Ireland
Preceded by William Brabazon	Earl of Meath; 1887–1929	Succeeded by Reginald Le Normand Brabazon
