= Frederick Maitland (disambiguation) =

Frederick Maitland (1763–1848) was a British Army general.

Frederick Maitland may also refer to:

- Frederick Lewis Maitland (Royal Navy officer, born 1730) (1730–1786), captain in the Royal Navy
- Frederick Maitland (Royal Navy officer, born 1777) (1777–1839), son of the above, rear-admiral in the Royal Navy
- Frederic William Maitland (1850–1906), English jurist and historian
- Frederick Maitland, 14th Earl of Lauderdale (1868–1931), Scottish peer and landowner
