= Anthony Maitland, 10th Earl of Lauderdale =

Royal Navy Admiral and hereditary peer (1785–1863)

Admiral The Right Honourable The Earl of Lauderdale GCB KCMG
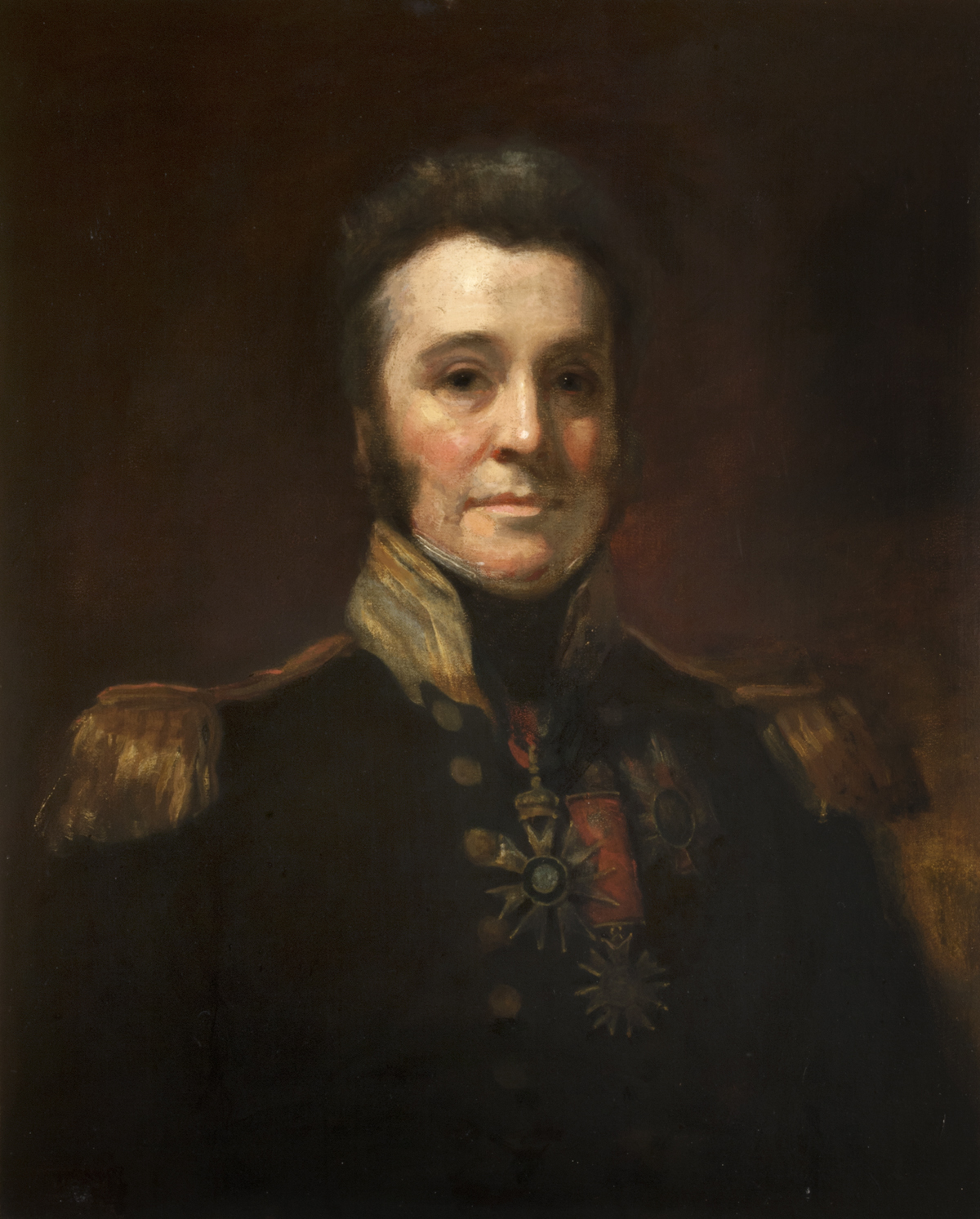
- Anthony Maitland, 10th Earl of Lauderdale, by Colvin Smith
- Born: 10 June 1785
- Died: 22 March 1863 (aged 77)
- Military career
- Allegiance: United Kingdom
- Branch: Royal Navy
- Service years: 1795–1863
- Rank: Admiral
- Commands: HMS Arrogant; HMS Pique; HMS Glasgow
- Conflicts: French Revolutionary War; Raids on Boulogne; Napoleonic Wars; War of 1812; Bombardment of Algiers

Admiral Anthony Maitland, 10th Earl of Lauderdale, GCB, KCMG (10 June 1785 – 22 March 1863) was a British naval officer who served during the French Revolutionary War, Napoleonic Wars and War of 1812. He also participated in the Bombardment of Algiers. He served as Member of Parliament for Haddington Burghs between 1813 and 1818 and Berwickshire between 1826 and 1832. From 1830 until he was promoted to rear-admiral in 1841 he was a naval aide-de-camp to at first King William IV and then Queen Victoria.

== Early life ==
Anthony Maitland was born on 10 June 1785 as the second son of James Maitland, 8th Earl of Lauderdale and Eleanor, the only daughter of Anthony Todd.

== Naval career ==
=== Early career ===
Maitland joined the Royal Navy on 2 October 1795 as an admiral's servant on the ship-of-the-line HMS Victory, being the flagship of Admiral Sir John Jervis in the Mediterranean Fleet. Maitland's name was born on Victory's books until June 1796. He was promoted to midshipman in October 1798 where he followed Admiral Jervis, now Lord St. Vincent, into the ship-of-the-line HMS Ville de Paris. In January 1801 Maitland transferred to the frigate HMS Triton under Captain John Gore in the English Channel, whom he then followed into the frigate HMS Medusa in April. While serving in Medusa Maitland distinguished himself in an action against the Boulogne Flotilla on 15 August. The boats of Medusa and the rest of the squadron under the command of Vice-Admiral Lord Nelson attempted under the cover of darkness to cut out the flotilla, however the French were prepared for the attack and repulsed it. The boats of Medusa attempted to board a brig but were stopped by nets rigged around the ship; they suffered fifty-five casualties, the most of any ship in the squadron, including Maitland who was severely injured.

In December 1803 Maitland left Medusa to re-join Lord St. Vincent as a supernumerary on Victory, still part of the Mediterranean Fleet. In August 1804, still serving on Victory, Maitland was promoted to acting lieutenant in the brig-sloop HMS Childers; he was confirmed as a lieutenant on 2 February 1805 and transferred to the ship-of-the-line HMS Blenheim, flagship of Rear-Admiral Sir Thomas Troubridge in the East Indies. On 6 August Blenheim participated in an indecisive action against the French ship-of-the-line Marengo and frigate Belle Poule. Maitland was promoted to commander on 6 May 1806 and took command of the ship-of-the-line HMS Arrogant, 'an old worn out 74', serving as the guard ship at Bombay.

=== Post-Captain ===
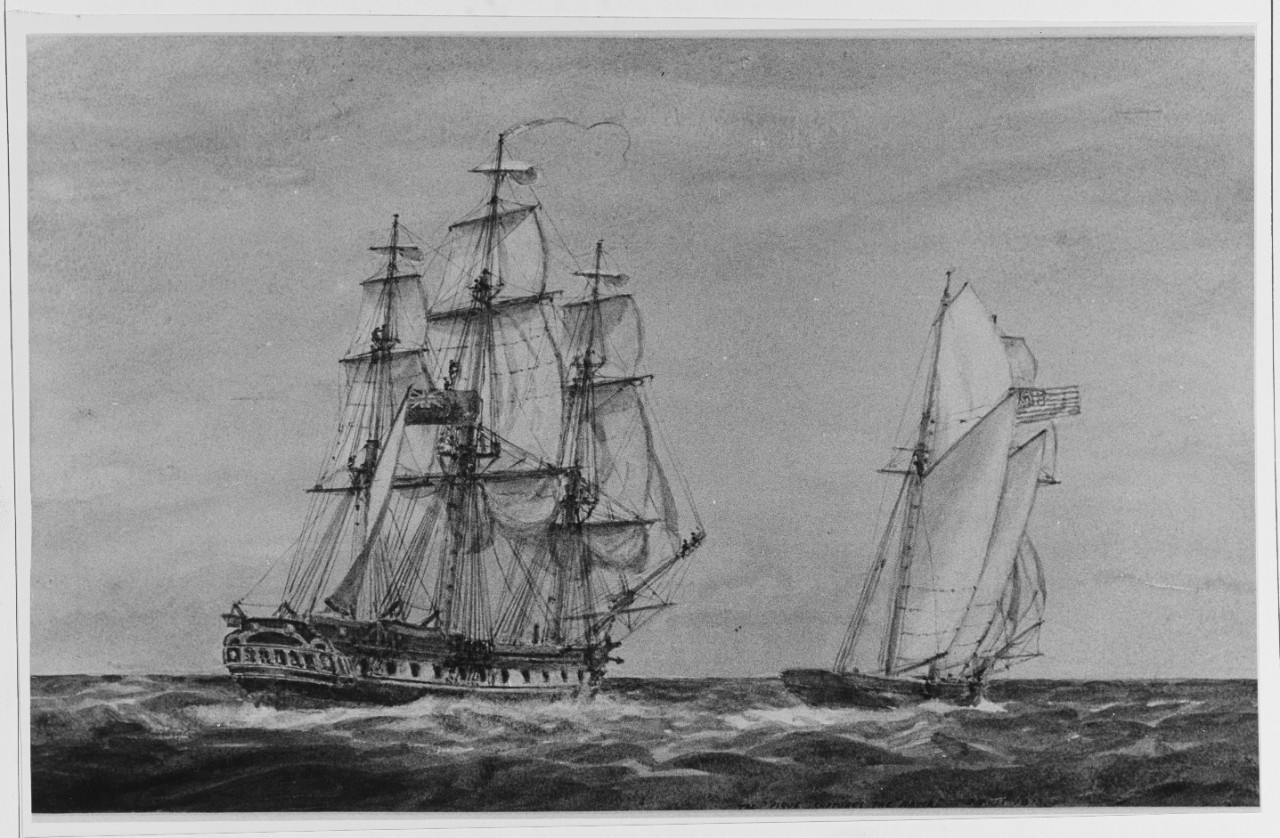
Pique takes the American privateer Hawk

Maitland was promoted to post-captain on 25 September of the same year, but his next command was not until 1 August 1811 when he was appointed to the frigate HMS Pique at Woolwich. His command of Pique resulted in some wide-ranging travel, including service on the Downs, Lisbon, South America, and Jamaica Stations. Maitland and Pique sailed for the Leeward Islands on 7 June 1812 to participate in the War of 1812. In August 1813 Maitland had Pique off the east coast of America; he successfully chased and captured the 5-gun American privateer Hawk which surrendered without a fight. On 13 and 19 January 1814 Pique took respectively the Swedish ships Bernat and Margaret and sent them in to Guadeloupe. Maitland and Pique sailed for Portsmouth at the end of 1814, but returned to the West Indies in the spring of 1815.

On 19 February 1816 Maitland was given command of the large frigate HMS Glasgow, in which he joined the fleet of Rear-Admiral Sir Edward Pellew on 20 July off Portsmouth, for service against Algiers. On 27 August the fleet began the Bombardment of Algiers, with Glasgow between the frigate HMS Severn and the Dutch frigate Melampus firing at the gun batteries of the town. When the ship-of-the-line HMS Impregnable signalled to the fleet that she had suffered one hundred and fifty casualties, Maitland volunteered to divert enemy fire from her. While Glasgow left her position in the line and attempted to close with Impregnable, the winds made movement very difficult and after an hour Glasgow had failed to move far from Severn, and was left open to fire from the Algiers fish markets that she had before been hidden from. Glasgow was heavily damaged during the engagement, having ten men killed and thirty-seven more wounded. Maitland was made a Companion of the Order of the Bath on 19 September for his service at the bombardment. He paid off Glasgow in November of the same year in order that she be repaired from her Algiers services, and recommissioned her again on 21 August 1817 for service in the Mediterranean Sea, where he served until March 1821 when he sailed Glasgow home and went on half-pay. On 26 February 1820 he was made a Knight Commander of the Order of St Michael and St George. In August 1830 he was appointed as a naval aide-de-camp to King William IV and continued as such under Queen Victoria until his promotion to flag rank.

=== Admiral ===
Maitland was promoted to rear-admiral as a rear-admiral of the blue on 23 November 1841 through seniority. He became a vice-admiral on 11 June 1851, and was promoted to admiral on 18 June 1857. (Note: Full dates of flag rank: Rear-admiral of the blue 23 November 1841, rear-admiral of the white 9 November 1846, rear-admiral of the red 23 March 1848, vice-admiral of the blue 11 June 1851, vice-admiral of the white 5 March 1853, vice-admiral of the red 11 September 1854, admiral of the blue 18 June 1857, admiral of the white 6 March 1858, admiral of the red 10 November 1862.) He was made a Knight Grand Cross of the Order of the Bath on 10 November 1862. Maitland died on 22 March 1863 as an admiral of the red, having never served at sea as an admiral.

== Political career ==
Coat of Arms of the Earls of Lauderdale

Maitland was a member of parliament for Haddington Burghs between 1813 and 1818, and Berwickshire between 1826 and 1832; he afterwards became a deputy lieutenant of Berwickshire. These seats were family seats, and when in parliament Maitland voted along the family line with the opposition. For his services Maitland was made a Knight Commander of the Order of the Bath on 6 April 1832. He became Earl of Lauderdale on 22 August 1860 upon the death of his elder brother James; he was able to sit in the House of Lords as a British peer instead of as a Scottish representative peer because of the subsidiary title Baron Lauderdale that had been granted to his father in 1806. Upon his death, Maitland's Scottish titles were inherited by his cousin Thomas Maitland while his English titles became extinct.

== Family ==
Maitland's uncle was Lieutenant-General Sir Thomas Maitland, who served as Lieutenant-Governor of Portsmouth and then Governor of Malta. Maitland's younger brother Colonel John Maitland died in 1839, while much of the rest of his family also served in the navy, such as his cousin and successor as earl, Admiral Sir Thomas Maitland. Maitland never married.

== Notes and citations ==
=== Citations ===
Parliament of the United Kingdom
Preceded by Thomas Maitland	Member of Parliament for Haddington Burghs; 1813–1818	Succeeded by John Hamilton-Dalrymple
Preceded by John Marjoribanks	Member of Parliament for Berwickshire; 1826–1832	Succeeded by Charles Albany Marjoribanks
Peerage of Scotland
Preceded by James Maitland	Earl of Lauderdale; 1860-1863	Succeeded by Thomas Maitland
Peerage of the United Kingdom
Preceded by James Maitland	Baron Lauderdale of Thirlestane; 1860–1863	Extinct
