= James Maitland, 9th Earl of Lauderdale =

British peer and Whig politician

James Maitland, 9th Earl of Lauderdale (12 May 1784 – 22 August 1860), styled Viscount Maitland between 1789 and 1839, was a British peer and Whig politician.

== Background and education ==
Lauderdale was the son of James Maitland, 8th Earl of Lauderdale, and Eleanor, daughter of Anthony Todd. He was educated at Eton and the University of Edinburgh.

== Political career ==
Lauderdale sat as Member of Parliament for Camelford from 1806 to 1807, for Richmond, Yorkshire, from 1818 to 1820 and for Appleby from 1828 to 1832. In 1839 he succeeded his father in the earldom and entered the House of Lords. He also served as Lord Lieutenant of Berwickshire between 1841 and 1860.

== Family ==
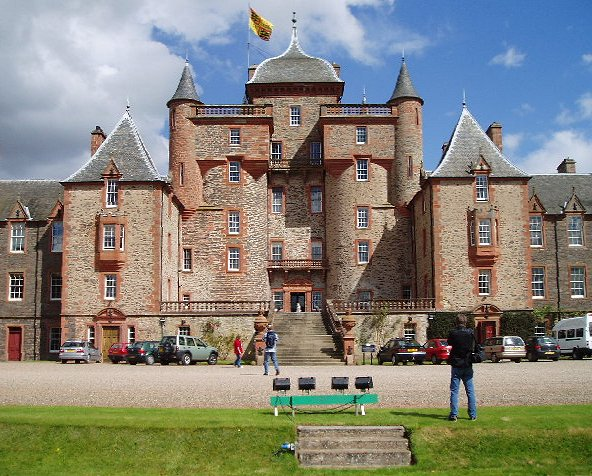
Thirlstane Castle, Borders

Lord Lauderdale died at Thirlestane Castle, Berwickshire, in August 1860, aged 76. He was unmarried and was succeeded in the earldom by his younger brother, Admiral Sir Anthony Maitland.

Parliament of the United Kingdom
| Preceded by Robert Adair; John Fonblanque | Member of Parliament for Camelford; 1806–1807; With: Robert Adair | Succeeded by Robert Adair; Lord Henry Petty |
| Preceded by Robert Chaloner; Dudley Long-North | Member of Parliament for Richmond, Yorkshire; 1818–1820; With: Hon. Thomas Dundas | Succeeded by Hon. Thomas Dundas; Samuel Moulton-Barrett |
| Preceded by Adolphus Dalrymple; Thomas Creevey | Member of Parliament for Appleby; 1828–1832; With: Henry Tufton 1826–1832; Charles Henry Barham 1832 | Constituency abolished |
Honorary titles
| Preceded by The Earl of Home | Lord Lieutenant of Berwickshire; 1841–1860 | Succeeded by David Robertson |
Peerage of Scotland
| Preceded by James Maitland | Earl of Lauderdale; 1839–1860 | Succeeded by Anthony Maitland |
