= Charles Barclay-Maitland, 12th Earl of Lauderdale =

Scottish peer

Charles Barclay-Maitland, 12th Earl of Lauderdale (29 September 1822 – 13 August 1884) was a Scottish peer killed by lightning.

He was son of Rev. Charles Barclay-Maitland, great-great-grandson of the 6th Earl of Lauderdale. He inherited the earldom on the death of Thomas Maitland, 11th Earl of Lauderdale, his second cousin once removed.

He died unmarried and was succeeded by his 3rd cousin Frederick Henry Maitland, the son of Major General Frederick Colthurst Maitland, great-great grandson of the 6th Earl.

== Notes ==
Peerage of Scotland
Preceded by Thomas Maitland	Earl of Lauderdale; 1878–1884	Succeeded by Frederick Maitland
