= Earl of Lauderdale =

Scottish peerage

Earldom of Lauderdale
- Creation date: 1624
- Created by: James VI and I
- Peerage: Peerage of Scotland
- First holder: John Maitland, 2nd Lord Maitland of Thirlestane
- Present holder: Ian Maitland, 18th Earl of Lauderdale
- Heir apparent: John Douglas Maitland, Master of Lauderdale, Viscount Maitland
- Subsidiary titles: Viscount of Lauderdale; Viscount Maitland; Lord Maitland of Thirlestane; Lord Thirlestane and Boulton
- Former seat: Thirlestane Castle

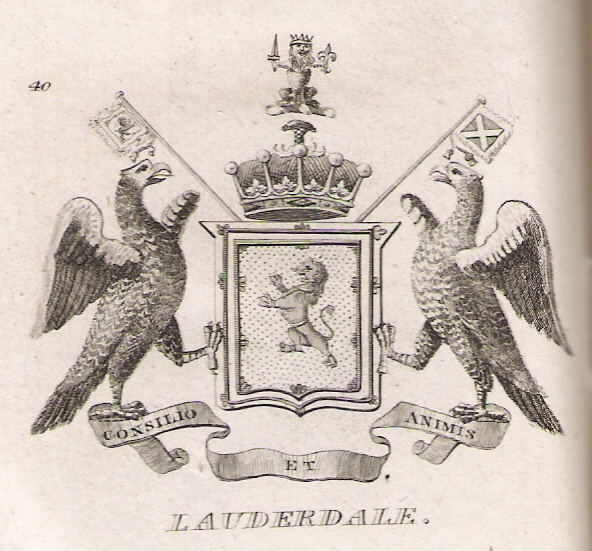
Arms of the Earls of Lauderdale as shown in Brown's The Peerage of Scotland, 1834

Earl of Lauderdale is a title in the Peerage of Scotland. The current holder of the title is Ian Maitland, 18th Earl of Lauderdale.

== History ==
The title was created in 1624 for John Maitland, 2nd Lord Maitland of Thirlestane, Berwickshire. The second Earl was created Duke of Lauderdale and by popular naming represented the "L" in the Cabal ministry, an acronym that amounted to the first major, perennial delegation of power from the monarch to a cabinet. When he died without male issue, the dukedom became extinct. The earldom passed to his brother Charles, 3rd Earl. Charles married, in 1652, Elizabeth, daughter of Richard Lauder of Haltoun and by this marriage came into that family's great estates.

Other titles associated with the earldom are: Viscount of Lauderdale (created 1616), Viscount of Maitland (1624), Lord Maitland of Thirlestane (1590) and Lord Thirlestane and Boulton (1624). All of these titles are in the Peerage of Scotland. The Earl of Lauderdale is the hereditary chief of Clan Maitland. The eldest son is the Master of Lauderdale. The title Viscount Maitland is sometimes used as a courtesy title for the Earl's eldest son and heir.

The Earl of Lauderdale, as Bearer for the Sovereign of the Sovereign's National Flag for Scotland, one of the Officers of the Royal Household in Scotland, has the right to bear the saltire for the Sovereign.

The historical family seat is Thirlestane Castle, near Lauder in Scotland, home of Captain the Hon. Gerald Maitland-Carew and his family. He is a son of Lady Sylvia Maitland – who became wife to the 6th Baron Carew – she was the eldest of two children of the 15th Earl of Lauderdale; her brother was killed in action in North Africa, aged 27 and left three daughters. Therefore the earldom passed to a cadet branch and the castle passed down the more direct female line.

Notable wives and Maitland descendants

- Elizabeth Tollemache, Countess of Dysart in her own right was (the second wife of the Duke) saw her titles and her estate of Ham House, Petersham, London (then in Surrey) pass to her son from her own previous marriage. The house is claimed by the National Trust to be "unique in Europe as the most complete survival of 17th century fashion and power."
- Lieutenant-Colonel John Maitland (1732–1779) was the tenth son (eighth-surviving childhood) of the sixth Earl, active in the Battle of Stono Ferry and Siege of Savannah.
- Lady Olga Maitland (1944–) is the first daughter of the seventeenth Earl and was the MP for Sutton and Cheam for one term of five years from 1992 and is a journalist.

== Lords Maitland of Thirlestane (1590) ==
- John Maitland, 1st Lord Maitland of Thirlestane (1537–1595)
- John Maitland, 2nd Lord Maitland of Thirlestane (died 1645), created Earl of Lauderdale in 1624

== Earls of Lauderdale (1624) ==
- John Maitland, 1st Earl of Lauderdale (same person as above)
- John Maitland, 2nd Earl of Lauderdale (1616–1682), created Duke of Lauderdale in 1672

== Duke of Lauderdale (1672) ==
also created Earl of Guilford and Baron Petersham in the Peerage of England in 1674

- John Maitland, 1st Duke of Lauderdale (same person as above)

All three titles created for him became extinct upon his death.

== Earls of Lauderdale (1624; reverted) ==
- Charles Maitland, 3rd Earl of Lauderdale (died 1691); 2nd son of the 1st Earl; brother of the 2nd Earl (1st Duke of Lauderdale)
- Richard Maitland, 4th Earl of Lauderdale (died 1695); eldest surviving son of the 3rd Earl
- John Lauder or Maitland, 5th Earl of Lauderdale (died 1710); 2nd surviving son of the 3rd Earl
  - Hon. James Maitland, Viscount Maitland (c. 1680–1709); eldest son of the 5th Earl, died without male issue
- Charles Maitland, 6th Earl of Lauderdale (c. 1688–1744); 2nd son of the 5th Earl
- James Maitland, 7th Earl of Lauderdale (1718–1789); eldest son of the 6th Earl
  - Hon. Valdave Charles Lauder Maitland, Viscount Maitland (1752–1754); eldest son of the 7th Earl
- James Maitland, 8th Earl of Lauderdale (1759–1839); eldest surviving son of the 7th Earl
- James Maitland, 9th Earl of Lauderdale (1784–1860); eldest son of the 8th Earl
- Anthony Maitland, 10th Earl of Lauderdale (1785–1863); 2nd son of the 8th Earl
  - Col. Hon. John Maitland (1789–1839); 3rd son of the 8th Earl, died without issue
  - Hon. Charles James Fox Maitland (1793–1817); 4th and youngest son of the 8th Earl
  - Lt. Gen. Rt Hon. Sir Thomas Maitland (died 1824); 3rd son of the 7th Earl
  - Gen. Hon William Mordaunt Maitland (1841); 4th and youngest son of the 7th Earl
- Thomas Maitland, 11th Earl of Lauderdale (1803–1878); only son of Gen. Hon. William Mordaunt Maitland, grandson of the 7th Earl; cousin of the 10th Earl
  - Hon. Charles Maitland later Barclay-Maitland (died 1795); 2nd son of the 6th Earl
  - Charles Barclay-Maitland of Tillcoutry (died 1818); son of Hon. Charles Barclay-Maitland
  - Rev. Charles Barclay-Maitland (1789–1844); son of Charles Barclay-Maitland
- Charles Barclay-Maitland, 12th Earl of Lauderdale (1822–1884); son of Rev. Charles Barclay-Maitland, great-great-grandson of the 6th Earl; second cousin once removed of the 11th Earl
  - Alexander Barclay-Maitland (died 1794); youngest brother of Charles Barclay-Maitland of Tillcoutry
  - Col. Hon. Richard Maitland (1724–1772); 3rd son of the 6th Earl
  - Capt. Richard Maitland (1768–1802); eldest son of Col. Hon. Richard Maitland; died without issue
  - Patrick Maitland of Kilmaron Castle (1770–1821); 2nd son of Col. Hon. Richard Maitland
  - Maj. Gen. Frederick Colthurst Maitland (1808–1876); son of Patrick Maitland
- Frederick Henry Maitland, 13th Earl of Lauderdale (1840–1924); son of Maj. Gen. Frederick Colthurst Maitland, great-great grandson of the 6th Earl; 3rd cousin of the 12th Earl
- Frederick Colin Maitland, 14th Earl of Lauderdale (1868–1931); eldest son of the 13th Earl
- Ian Colin Maitland, 15th Earl of Lauderdale (1891–1953); eldest son of the 14th Earl
  - Hon. Ivor Colin James Maitland, Viscount Maitland (1915–1943), only son of the 15th Earl, killed in action in World War II at Africa, died without male issue
  - Rev. and Hon. Sydney George William Maitland (1869–1946); 2nd son of the 13th Earl
- Alfred Sydney Frederick Maitland, 16th Earl of Lauderdale (1904–1968); eldest son of Rev. and Hon. Sydney George William Maitland; grandson of the 13th Earl. Maitland died under mysterious circumstances; three days after he disappeared on 24 November 1968 his body washed up on a beach at Angmering in Sussex, England.
- Patrick Francis Maitland, 17th Earl of Lauderdale (1911–2008); 2nd son of Rev. and Hon. Sydney George William Maitland; grandson of the 13th Earl; brother of the 16th Earl
- Ian Maitland, 18th Earl of Lauderdale (b. 1937); eldest son of the 17th Earl

The heir apparent is the present holder's son, John Douglas Maitland, Viscount Maitland (b. 1965). His uncle, the next in line, is the Rev. Hon. Sydney Milivoje Maitland (b. 1951). Both are childless.
Next in succession to the peerages is the line of the Maitland baronets, descended from the 5th son of the 6th earl. The current baronet is Sir Charles Alexander Maitland, 10th Baronet (b. 1986), the present earl's sixth cousin twice removed (see descent below).

Line of succession (Earls of Lauderdale and Maitland baronets, of Clifton, simplified)
- Charles Maitland, 6th Earl of Lauderdale (c. 1688–1744)
  - James Maitland, 7th Earl of Lauderdale (1718–1789)
    - James Maitland, 8th Earl of Lauderdale (1759–1839)
      - James Maitland, 9th Earl of Lauderdale (1784–1860)
      - Anthony Maitland, 10th Earl of Lauderdale (1785–1863)
    - Hon. William Mordaunt Maitland (d. 1841)
      - Thomas Maitland, 11th Earl of Lauderdale (1803–1878)
  - Hon. Charles Barclay-Maitland (d. 1795)
    - Charles Barclay-Maitland (d. 1816)
      - Charles Barclay-Maitland (1789–1844)
        - Charles Barclay-Maitland, 12th Earl of Lauderdale (1822–1884)
  - Hon. Richard Maitland (1724–1772)
    - Patrick Maitland (1770–1821)
      - Frederick Colthurst Maitland (1808–1876)
        - Frederick Maitland, 13th Earl of Lauderdale (1840–1924)
          - Frederick Maitland, 14th Earl of Lauderdale (1868–1931)
            - Ian Maitland, 15th Earl of Lauderdale (1891–1953)
          - Sydney George William Maitland (1869–1946)
            - Alfred Maitland, 16th Earl of Lauderdale (1904–1968)
            - Patrick Maitland, 17th Earl of Lauderdale (1911–2008)
              - Ian Maitland, 18th Earl of Lauderdale (b. 1937)
                - (1). John Douglas Maitland, Viscount Maitland (b. 1965)
              - (2). Hon. Sydney Milivoje Maitland (b. 1951)
  - Sir Alexander Maitland, 1st Baronet (1728–1820)
    - Sir Alexander Charles Gibson-Maitland, 2nd Baronet (1755–1848)
      - Alexander Maitland (1787–1828)
        - George Ramsay Maitland (1821–1866)
          - Sir John Nisbet Maitland, 5th Baronet (1850–1936)
            - Sir George Ramsay Maitland, 7th Baronet (1882–1960)
              - Sir Alexander Keith Maitland, 8th Baronet (1920–1963)
                - Sir Richard John Maitland, 9th Baronet (1952–1994)
                  - (1,3). Sir Charles Alexander Maitland, 10th Baronet (b. 1986)
                - (2,4). Robert Ramsay Maitland (b. 1956)
                  - (3,5). Harry Robert Maitland (b. 1986)
                  - (4,6). John Richard Maitland (b. 1992)
              - John Ramsay Maitland (1924–2012)
                - (5,7). David Ramsay Maitland (b. 1954)
                - James Maitland (1957–2014)
                  - (6,8). Alexander Findlay Maitland (b. 1989)
                  - (7,9). Charles Percy Maitland (b. 1991)
                - (8,10). Keith John Maitland (b. 1969)
              - James Maitland (1927–2016)
                - (9,11). Alexander Henry Maitland (b. 1964)

The simplified chart above lists those individuals in the line of succession who are nearest in consanguinity to the present earl; there are further heirs in descent from the 2nd Baronet, the 1st Baronet and from other younger sons of the 6th earl.

== Arms ==
Coat of arms of the Earl of Lauderdale
Crest A Lion sejant affrontée Gules ducally crowned proper in his dexter paw a sword of the last hilted and pommelled Or and in his sinister a Fleur-de-lys Azure. Escutcheon Or a Lion rampant Gules couped at all his joints if the field within the Royal Tressure Azure in a Dexter Canton Argent a Saltire Azure surmounted of an Inescutcheon Or charged with a Lion rampant within a Double Tressure flory counterflory Gules. Supporters On either side an Eagle proper. Motto Consilio Et Animis (By wisdom and courage). Other elements Behind the shield on Staffs in saltire proper two representations of the Sovereign's National Flag of Scotland (Cross of St Andrew) fringed Or roped and tasseled of the last (Insignia of Office of the Bearer for the Sovereign of the Sovereign's National Flag of Scotland). Symbolism The Arms of the Earls of Lauderdale are canting as they represent a mutilated lion, forming a pun on the name Maitland; as Hereditary National Flag Bearers, the Earls of Lauderdale are entitled to use the Banner of Scotland in their Arms.
