= Patrick Maitland, 17th Earl of Lauderdale =

Scottish Unionist politician

The Right Honourable The Earl of Lauderdale

Member of Parliament for Lanark
- In office 25 October 1951 – 18 September 1959
- Preceded by: Alec Douglas-Home
- Succeeded by: Judith Hart

Personal details
- Born: Patrick Maitland; 17 March 1911
- Died: 2 December 2008 (aged 97)
- Party: Unionist
- Spouse: Stanka Losanitch (m. 1936; died 2003)

Patrick Francis Maitland, 17th Earl of Lauderdale, FRGS (17 March 1911 – 2 December 2008), styled The Hon. Patrick Maitland, Master of Lauderdale, from 1953 to 1968, was a Scottish Unionist politician.

== Early life ==
Educated at Lancing, West Sussex, and Brasenose College, Oxford (B.A. Hons., 1933), Maitland then entered a career in journalism. During the Second World War he served as Special Correspondent (Balkans & Danubian) for The Times 1939–1941, and in the latter year was also Special Correspondent for the Washington News Chronicle. He was then War Correspondent for the News Chronicle in the Pacific, Australia, and New Zealand 1941–1943, was with the US Marines at Guadalcanal, flew as a tail gunner in a B17 and then joined the Political Intelligence Department of the Foreign Office where he ran the Yugoslav Department British Foreign Office, 1943–1945.

== Politics ==
In 1951, he was elected a member of parliament (MP) for Lanark, after its previous MP (and future Prime Minister) Alec Douglas-Home was disqualified after succeeding to his father's peerage. Maitland held the seat until 1959 when it was taken by Labour candidate Judith Hart. From 1957 to 1959 he was Founder-Chairman of the Expanding Commonwealth Group at the House of Commons, where he was also Chairman of the Sub-Committee on Energy, and Transport.

Maitland succeeded his brother, The Reverend Alfred Maitland, 16th Earl of Lauderdale in the earldom in 1968. He was also a member of the Conservative Monday Club; and was Chairman of the House of Lords Select Committee on EEC Scrutiny 1974–1979, Vice-Chairman of the Association of Conservative Peers Committee 1980–1987, Vice-Chairman and co-founder of the parliamentary group for Energy Studies 1980–1999, appointed Chairman of the 'Church in Danger' All-Party Parliamentary Group 1988. He was a Life member of the Society for Individual Freedom. At the time of his death, aged 97, he was the second oldest living former Member of Parliament, exceeded only by Bert Hazell.

== Other ==
Lauderdale's other roles included being a Director of Elf Aquitaine (UK) Holdings Ltd., Consultant in Economic Geography, an Industrial Consultant, a former editor of The Fleet Street Letter Service (an agency for political and diplomatic news), and editor of The Whitehall Letter. He was a member of the College of Guardians of the National Shrine of Our Lady of Walsingham, Norfolk 1955–1982, and was President of The Church Union 1956–1961. He was a Fellow of the Royal Geographical Society and a member of the Travellers Club in London and the New Club in Edinburgh. He was also the Hereditary Bearer of the National Flag of Scotland, and Clan Chief of Clan Maitland

His publications include:

- European Dateline (1945)
- Task for Giants (1957)

== Marriage ==
On 20 July 1936, he married Stanka (died 2003), elder daughter of Professor Milivoje Losanitch (serb. Lozanić), from Belgrade, Yugoslavia, granddaughter of Professor Sima Losanitch, chemist, president of the Serbian Royal Academy, first rector of University of Belgrade, minister of foreign affairs, ambassador of the Kingdom of Serbia in London etc., and had issue:

- Ian Maitland, 18th Earl of Lauderdale (born 4 November 1937) Lieutenant, Royal Navy Reserve, member of the Queen's Bodyguard for Scotland, Royal Company of Archers, and a banker. He is married, and has issue. His son is John Douglas Maitland, now Master of Lauderdale (b. 1965), who is divorced, with no issue.
- Lady Olga Maitland (born 23 May 1944), who also became a prominent politician and Conservative Party (UK) Member of Parliament, 1992–1997.; 1969 married Robin William Patrick Hamilton Hay, M.A., LL.B., a Crown Court Recorder. They have two sons and a daughter.
- Lady (Caroline Charlotte) Militza Maitland (1946–2010) a counseller and physiotherapist.
- Rev. Hon. Sydney Milivoje Patrick Maitland (born 23 June 1951), a priest of the Scottish Episcopal Church.

== Sources ==
- Leigh Rayment's Peerage Pages – Peerages beginning with "L" (part 1)
- Leigh Rayment's Historical List of MPs

Parliament of the United Kingdom
Preceded by Alec Douglas-Home	Member of Parliament for Lanark; 1951–1959	Succeeded by Judith Hart
Peerage of Scotland
Preceded by Alfred Maitland	Earl of Lauderdale; 1968–2008	Succeeded by Ian Maitland
