= Lewis Streane =

Lewis Henry Streane was an Irish Anglican priest:

Streane was born in County Roscommon and educated at Trinity College, Dublin. He was Archdeacon of Glendalough from 1872 until 1888. He died on 17 May 1890.
