= Ian Maitland, 15th Earl of Lauderdale =

British Army officer and peer (1891–1953)

The Right Honourable The Earl of Lauderdale
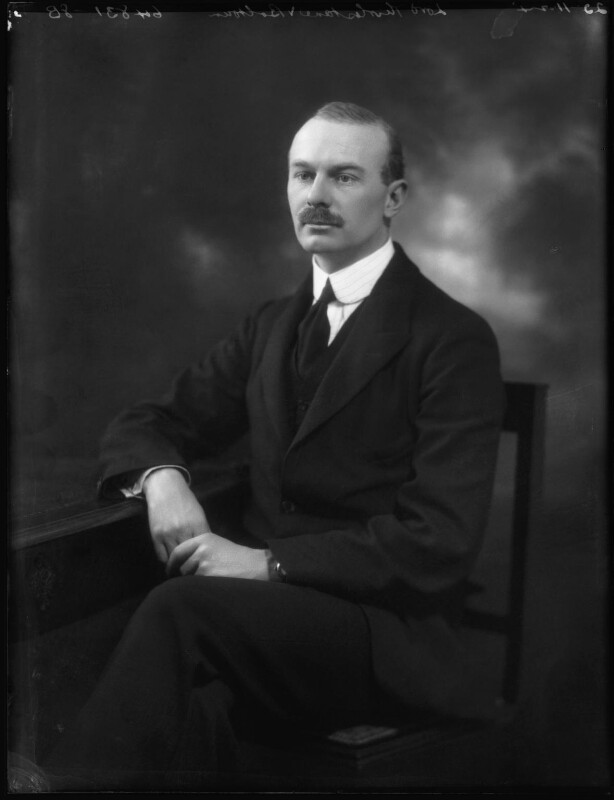
- Born: Ian Colin Maitland; 30 January 1891
- Died: 17 February 1953 (aged 62)
- Predecessor: Frederick Maitland
- Successor: Alfred Maitland
- Spouse: Ethel Mary Ivy
- Parents: Frederick Maitland, 14th Earl of Lauderdale (father); Gwendoline Lucy (mother)

Ian Colin Maitland, 15th Earl of Lauderdale DL (30 January 1891 – 17 February 1953), styled Viscount Maitland between 1924 and 1931, was a representative peer for Scotland in the House of Lords from 1931 to 1945.

Maitland was the only child of Frederick Maitland, 14th Earl of Lauderdale by his wife Gwendoline Lucy (d. 30 January 1929), daughter of Robert Vaughan Williams, a judge, of Bodlonfa, Flintshire. He succeeded to the titles upon his father's death in 1931.

Educated at Eton College, Maitland saw active service in the First World War. He was a Major in the 3rd Reserve Battalion of the Queen's Own Cameron Highlanders in 1915–1916, and in 1918 was Aide-de-Camp to the Lord Lieutenant of Ireland.

He was also a member of the Royal Company of Archers, the King's Bodyguard for Scotland, and a Deputy Lieutenant for Berwickshire.

He was president of the Southampton Conservative Association, 1931–1935, and Honorary President of the Association of Certified and Corporate Accountants from 1931 to 1945.

In 1943, he was caught having sex with a kitchen porter, Robert Wilson, in an alleyway in Soho. So deferential was society in those days that the judge ordered the jury to find him not guilty, even though Wilson was jailed for nine months for engaging in homosexual sex, which at the time was illegal.

== Family ==
Lord Lauderdale married Ethel Mary Ivy (died 1971 or 1972), eldest daughter of James Jardine Bell-Irving of Makerstoun, Roxburghshire, on 11 November 1912. They resided at Thirlestane Castle, near Lauder, Berwickshire, and had two children:

- Lady Sylvia Gwendoline Eva Maitland (22 September 1913 – 1991), who married 3 June 1937 William Conolly-Carew, 6th Baron Carew, and left two sons and two daughters.
- Ivor Colin, Viscount Maitland, (29 August 1915 – 18 January 1943), killed in action in North Africa, aged 27. He married, in 1936 (aged 21), Helena Ruth Perrott (1912– 1 September 1999, aged 87), daughter of Sir Herbert Charles Perrott, 5th and 1st Bt., and left three daughters. These daughters were raised to the rank, style and precedence of an earl's daughters by Royal Warrant dated 28 October 1953, and published 24 November 1953 in the London Gazette
  - Lady Mary Helena Maitland now Mary, Lady Biddulph (b. 1938), who married 1958 the 4th Baron Biddulph (1931–1988) and has two sons, including Nicholas Maitland-Biddulph, 5th Baron Biddulph, and one daughter.
  - Lady Anne Priscilla Maitland (b. 1940), who married John Joseph Eyston, of East Hendred (b. 1934), of a prominent Catholic recusant family, and has one son and two daughters.
  - Lady Elizabeth Sylvia Maitland (b. 1943 posthumously), who is not married.

== Sources ==
- Black, A & C., Who's Who, London, 1945, p. 1583.
- Mosley, Charles, editor, Burke's Peerage & Baronetage, 106th edition, 1999, Crans, Switzerland, vol. II, p. 1647. ISBN 2-940085-02-1
- 15th Earl's portrait in 1924.

Peerage of Scotland
Preceded by Frederick Maitland	Earl of Lauderdale; 1931–1953	Succeeded by Alfred Maitland
