= Thomas Maitland, 11th Earl of Lauderdale =

Royal Navy Admiral of the Fleet (1803–1878)

Admiral of the Fleet The Right Honourable The Earl of Lauderdale GCB
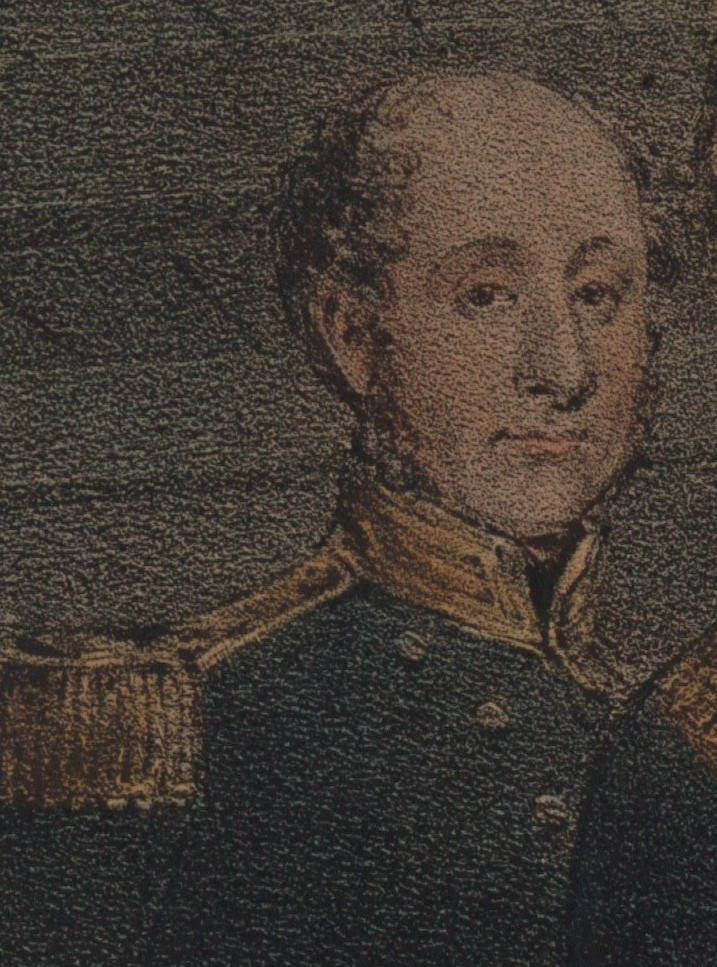
- Thomas Maitland
- Born: 3 February 1803; Frankfort, County Cork
- Died: 1 September 1878 (aged 75)
- Military career
- Allegiance: United Kingdom
- Branch: Royal Navy
- Service years: 1816–1873
- Rank: Admiral of the Fleet
- Commands: HMS Sparrowhawk; HMS Tweed; HMS Wellesley; Pacific Station
- Conflicts: Greek War of Independence; Irish and German Mercenary Soldiers' Revolt; First Carlist War; First Opium War
- Awards: Knight Grand Cross of the Order of the Bath

Admiral of the Fleet Thomas Maitland, 11th Earl of Lauderdale, GCB (3 February 1803 – 1 September 1878) was a Royal Navy officer and peer. As a junior officer he saw action supporting the blockade of Algiers by Greek revolutionaries in July 1824 during the Greek War of Independence and then took part in an operation to land a naval brigade in Brazil to protect Pedro I, the Emperor of Brazil, in the face of the Irish and German Mercenary Soldiers' Revolt. He also took part in the Battle of Luchana, an operation to defend the Port of Bilbao on the north coast of Spain, during the First Carlist War.

Maitland also fought at various battles during the First Opium War including the Battle of Canton at which he commanded the 1st naval battalion. He gave evidence to the Royal Commission on the Defence of the United Kingdom and argued that building powerful ships was more important than building fortifications. He went on to be Commander-in-Chief, Pacific Station.

== Early career ==
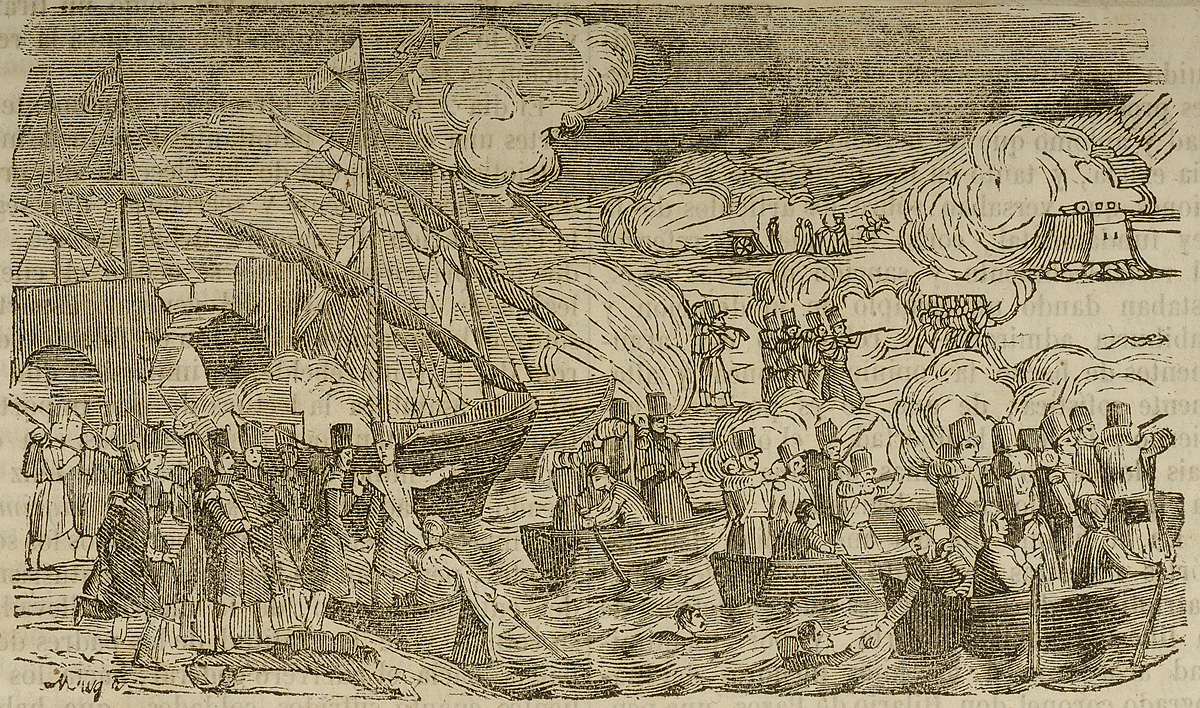
Operations to defend the Port of Bilbao in which Maitland took part in December 1836

Born the only son of General the Hon. William Maitland (himself the fourth son of James Maitland, 7th Earl of Lauderdale) and Mary Maitland (née Orpen), Maitland joined the navy on 22 September 1816. Promoted to lieutenant on 16 May 1823, he was appointed to the frigate HMS Euryalus in the Mediterranean Fleet. In HMS Euryalus he saw action supporting the blockade of Algiers by Greek revolutionaries in July 1824 during the Greek War of Independence. He transferred to the guard ship HMS Superb at Portsmouth in December 1825 and to the second-rate HMS Ganges, flagship of Admiral Sir Robert Otway serving as Commander-in-Chief of the South America Station, in March 1826. Promoted to commander on 30 April 1827, he saw action again when HMS Ganges took part in an operation to land a naval brigade in Brazil to protect Pedro I, the Emperor of Brazil, in the face of the Irish and German Mercenary Soldiers' Revolt in June 1828. He returned home when HMS Ganges became the guard ship at Portsmouth in 1829.

Maitland became commanding officer of the sloop HMS Sparrowhawk on the North America and West Indies Station in June 1832 and brought home a treasure freight of $589,405 and 42 bales of cochineal (a scale insect from which the crimson-coloured natural dye carmine is derived) when he returned in May 1833. He became commanding officer of the sixth-rate HMS Tweed and took part in the Battle of Luchana, an operation to defend the Port of Bilbao on the north coast of Spain, in December 1836 during the First Carlist War. As a result of this he was awarded the knight's cross of the Order of Charles III for his support for the liberal forces of Maria Christina, the Regent of Spain at the time of the minority of Isabella II, who had faced a revolt by Carlos, Count of Molina.

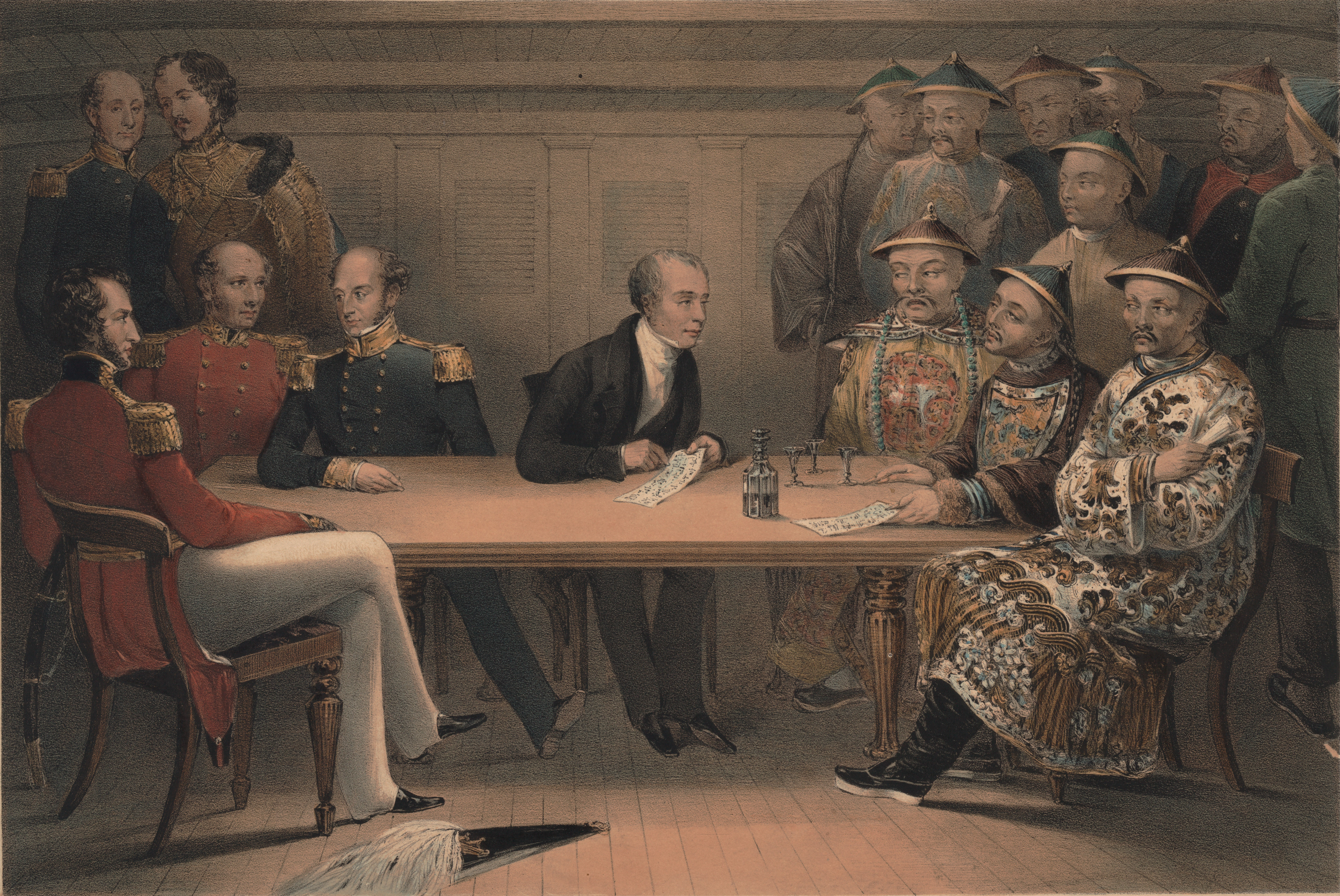
Capt. Maitland (top left) at the Chusan conference on board HMS Wellesley on 4 July 1840

Promoted to captain on 10 January 1837, Maitland became commanding officer of the third-rate HMS Wellesley, flagship of Rear Admiral Frederick Maitland serving as Commander-in-Chief of the East Indies and China Station, in June 1837. He saw action off the Persian Gulf in 1839 and then, following the death of Frederick Maitland in November 1839, served under Commodore Gordon Bremer at the Capture of Chusan in July 1840, at the Second Battle of Chuenpi in January 1841 and at the Battle of the Bogue in February 1841 during the First Opium War. He also commanded the 1st naval battalion during the Battle of Canton in May 1841 for which he was appointed a Commander of the Order of the Bath on 29 June 1841. He remained on the station and, after taking part in the Battle of Amoy in August 1841, fought at some of the later battles under Rear Admiral Sir William Parker including the Capture of Chusan in October 1841, the Battle of Ningpo in March 1842, the Battle of Woosung in June 1842 and the Battle of Chinkiang in July 1842 which ultimately led to the Treaty of Nanking ending the war in August 1842.

Maitland went on to be commanding officer of the third-rate HMS America off the coast of Portugal in November 1846, commanding officer of the first-rate HMS San Josef, flagship of Admiral Sir William Gage serving as Commander-in-Chief, Plymouth, in April 1848 and commanding officer of the second-rate HMS Impregnable, Gage's new flagship, in January 1849. After that he became commanding officer of the second-rate HMS Agamemnon in the Channel Squadron in September 1852, commanding officer of the first-rate HMS Victory, flagship of Admiral Sir Thomas Cochrane serving as Commander-in-Chief, Portsmouth, in December 1853 and commanding officer of the Gunnery School HMS Excellent at Portsmouth in January 1854.

== Senior command ==
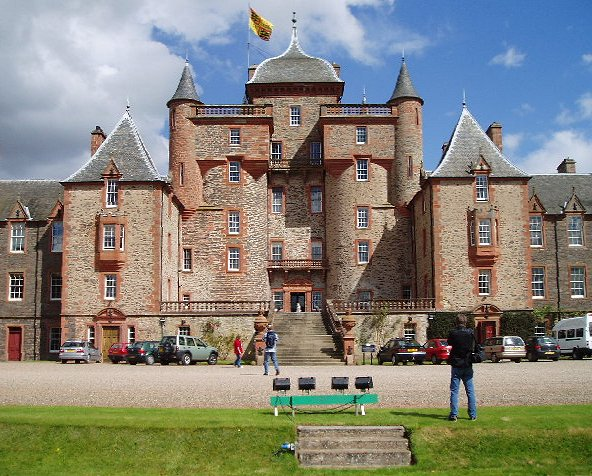
Thirlestane Castle, Maitland's home in Berwickshire

Promoted to rear-admiral on 18 June 1857, Maitland gave evidence to the Royal Commission on the Defence of the United Kingdom in 1859 and argued that building powerful ships was more important than building fortifications. He became Commander-in-Chief, Pacific Station, with his flag in the screw frigate HMS Bacchante, in May 1860 and stood down from that post in October 1862. He inherited the title of Earl of Lauderdale on the death of his cousin on 22 March 1863, was promoted to vice admiral on 30 November 1863 and was advanced to Knight Commander of the Order of the Bath on 28 March 1865.

Maitland was appointed First and Principal Naval Aide-de-Camp to the Queen on 22 November 1866. Promoted to full admiral on 8 April 1868, he retired in February 1873 and was advanced to Knight Grand Cross of the Order of the Bath on 24 May 1873. He was promoted to Admiral of the Fleet on 27 December 1877 and died at his home, Thirlestane Castle in Berwickshire on 1 September 1878.

== Family ==
On 7 February 1828, Maitland married Amelia Young at Rio de Janeiro (whilst posted in South America) and they had one son, Thomas Mordaunt (1838–1844), and three daughters, Isabel Anne (d. 1854), Lady Alice Charlotte (d. 1883) and Lady Mary Jane (1847–1918). Mary Jane Maitland married Reginald Brabazon, twelfth earl of Meath

He was succeeded in the earldom by Charles Barclay-Maitland, his second cousin once removed.

== Legacy ==
Lauderdale Road in London's Maida Vale is named after him.

== Sources ==
- Black, William (1900). Narrative of Cruises in the Mediterranean in HMS Euryalus and Chanticleer during the Greek War of Independence (1822-1826). Simpkin, Marshall and Co. ASIN B0008C3822.

Military offices
Preceded by Sir Robert Baynes	Commander-in-Chief, Pacific Station; 1860–1862	Succeeded by Sir John Kingcome
Honorary titles
Preceded by Sir William Parker, Bt.	First and Principal; Naval Aide-de-Camp; 1866–1873	Succeeded by Sir James Hope
Peerage of Scotland
Preceded by Anthony Maitland	Earl of Lauderdale; 1863–1878	Succeeded by Charles Barclay-Maitland
