= Mary Jane Brabazon, Countess of Meath =

British philanthropist (1847–1918)

The Right Honourable The Countess of Meath
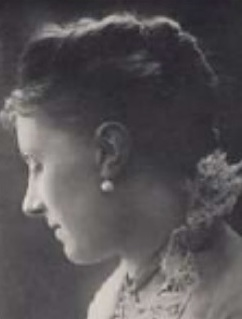
- Born: Lady Mary Jane Maitland; 15 March 1847; London
- Died: 4 November 1918 (aged 71); Kilruddery House
- Spouse: Reginald Brabazon, 12th Earl of Meath (m. 1868; died 1918)
- Parent(s): Amelia Young; Thomas Maitland, 11th Earl of Lauderdale

Lady Mary Jane Maitland became Mary Jane Brabazon, Countess of Meath (15 March 1847 – 4 November 1918) was a British philanthropist; founder of the Ministering Children's League.

== Early life ==
Maitland was born in 1847 in London. She was the daughter of Amelia (née Young), Countess of Lauderdale, and Thomas Maitland, 11th Earl of Lauderdale.

== Career ==
Lord Meath served as a diplomat abroad but he refused to go to Athens in 1873 to please her family. He resigned in 1877. He and his wife did not need to work so they decided to deal with "social problems and the relief of human suffering". The Earl and his wife leased Ottershaw Park from Sir Edward Colebrooke from 1882 to November 1883.

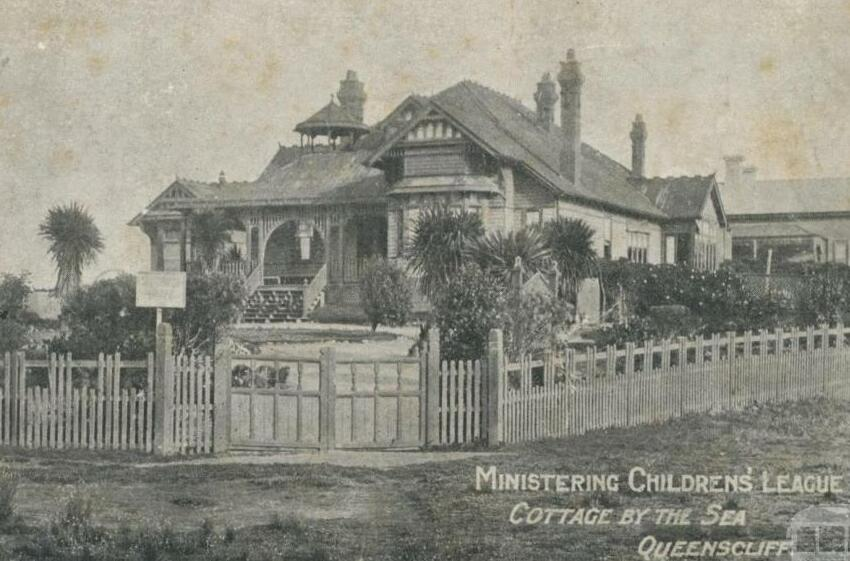
Ministering Children's League building in Queenscliff, 1906

In 1885, the Countess set up the Ministering Children's League. In 1890, she bought Westbrook Place in Godalming and over the next two years it was converted to be The Meath Home of Comfort for Epileptics. The home was for epileptic women and it was opened by the Duchess of Albany on 4 August 1892. It was based on the ideas of Friedrich von Bodelschwingh. In time, two large extensions were added to the home.

She tried to set up a branch of the Ministering Children's League when she visited abroad. In 1892, she and her husband visited New Zealand and Tasmania. In Hobart, she spoke about the success of the Ministering Children's League, which was reported to have 40,000 members. It was agreed to start a group in Hobart and this work was led by Emily Dobson. By 1906 there was a home in Victoria.

In 1909, The Countess went to Shanghai where she inspired a new group of the MCL. There was already a group in Hong Kong but, by 1910, she inspired other groups in Penang and Singapore. She felt that she had created divisions in "the East" but was keen that the MCL should not confine itself to Aglophones but might also spread to children native to the countries involved. Her diaries were posthumously published in 1928.

== Personal life ==
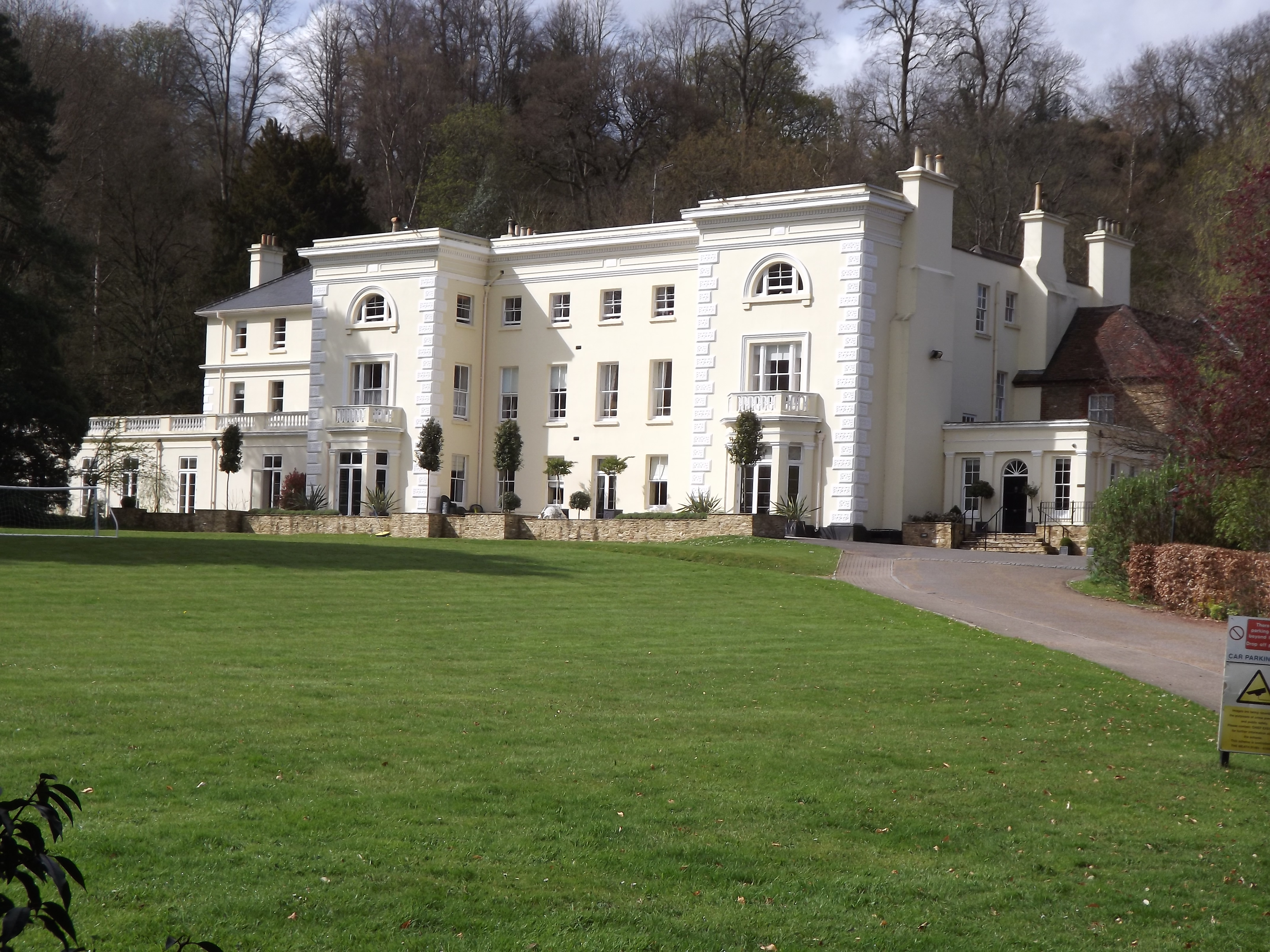
The Meath Home in Godalming, run by the Epilepsy Trust, 2012

In 1868, the then Lady Mary Jane Maitland married Reginald Brabazon, 12th Earl of Meath. Together, they were the parents of:

- Reginald Le Normand Brabazon, 13th Earl of Meath (1869–1949), who married Lady Aileen May Wyndham-Quin, daughter of Wyndham Wyndham-Quin, 4th Earl of Dunraven, in 1908.
- Lady Violet Constance Maitland Brabazon (1886–1936), who married James Grimston, 4th Earl of Verulam.

She died on 4 November 1918 in Ireland, survived by her husband. She left her property as a gift to her charities to further their work.
