= Clan Maitland =

Scottish clan

- Motto: Consilio Et Animis (By wisdom and courage)

Chief
- The Rt. Hon. Ian Maitland
- The 18th Earl of Lauderdale
- Seat: Thirlestane Castle
Septs of Clan Maitland
Lauderdale, Maitland, Maizland, Maltland, Mateland, Matelande, Matheland, Matilland, Matillande, Matlain, Matland, Mauteland, Mautelande, Mautelent, Mautlent, Mautalen, Medlin, Metellan, Metlan, Mettlin, Maitlen
Allied clans
Clan Seton
Clan Campbell
Rival clans
Clan Gordon

Clan Maitland is a Lowland Scottish clan.

== History ==
=== Origins of the clan ===
The name Maitland is of Norman origin and was originally spelt Mautalent, Mautalen, Matulant or Matalan, it translates as "evil genius". It is claimed that the Maitlands descend from one of the companions of William the Conqueror who later settled in Northumberland. The name is found on numerous early charters as Matulant, Mautalant and Maltalant. It has been suggested that it was a nickname meaning 'bad' or 'poor wit', however Alexander Nisbet gives Quasi mutilatus in bello which means As if mutilated in war.

During the reign of Alexander III of Scotland, Sir Richard Matulant acquired the lands of Thirleston, Blyth and Hedderwick. He became one of the most considerable barons in the Scottish Borders. He had come into ownership of Thirlestane by his marriage to Avicia, heiress to Thomas de Thirlestane.

=== Wars of Scottish Independence ===
Sir William Mautlant de Thirlstane supported Robert the Bruce in the cause of Scottish independence and was present at the Scottish victory at the Battle of Bannockburn in 1314. His son was Sir Robert Maitland who inherited his father's lands as well as receiving a charter for the lands of Letherington near Haddington, from Sir John Gifford in about 1345. He was survived by three sons: John, William and Robert of Shivas. Robert is the ancestor of the Aberdeenshire branch of the Clan Maitland, whose senior line lived at Balhargardy near Inverurie. William's successors were styled as "of Letherington", while the eldest son John became involved in the conspiracies of George Dunbar I, Earl of March who was his kinsman.

William's son, Robert Maitland, surrendered Dunbar Castle to the Earl of Douglas and as a result escaped from being involved in the ruin of his uncle, John. The heir of Sir Robert Maitland was William Maitland of Letherington who received a charter confirming his lands of Blyth, Hedderwick and Tollus.

=== 16th century and Anglo-Scottish wars ===
William Maitland's great-grandson was killed at the Battle of Flodden in 1513. The heir of the Maitland knight killed at Flodden was Sir Richard Maitland who was appointed a judge of the Court of Session and Keeper of the Privy Seal of Scotland.

Sir Richard Maitland's eldest son was William Maitland who has passed into Scottish history as Secretary Letherington, confidante of Mary, Queen of Scots. However he fell from favour for his involvement in the murder of David Rizzio who was Mary' secretary, although he was allowed to return to court a year later. He supported Mary's marriage to James Hepburn, 4th Earl of Bothwell, but later joined the nobles who opposed the queen at the Battle of Carberry Hill and also the Battle of Langside. Maitland attended the coronation of the infant James VI of Scotland in 1567 but kept in secret communication with the queen during her escape from Lochleven Castle. As a result Maitland was declared a traitor by Parliament in June 1573 and as his son died without issue he was succeeded by his brother, John Maitland, 1st Lord Maitland of Thirlestane. Sir John Maitland was created the 1st Lord of Thirlestane and married the heiress of Lord Fleming. He was Lord High Chamberlain of Scotland in the reign of Mary, Queen of Scots, and his son was created the first Earl of Lauderdale. His sister, Anne married Robert, Lord Seton son of the 1st Earl of Winton. Through frequent marriages with the families of Fleming and Clan Seton the Clan Maitland became loyal adherents to Mary, Queen of Scots, even when her fortunes were at their lowest.

=== 17th century and Civil War ===
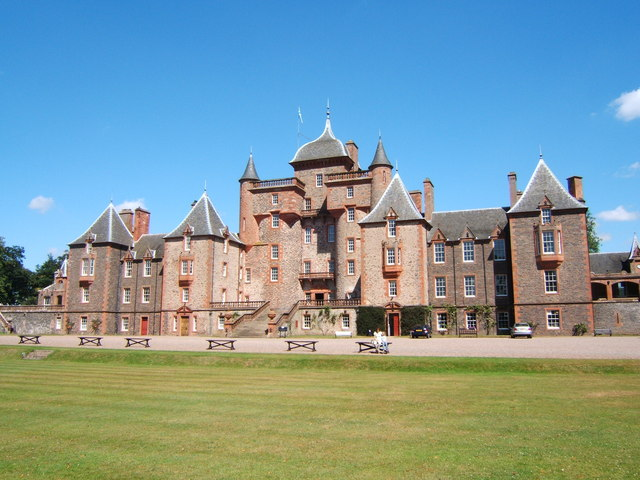
Thirlestane Castle, historic seat of the chiefs of Clan Maitland. It was converted into a renaissance palace by John Maitland, 1st Duke of Lauderdale.

The only son of John Maitland, 1st Lord Maitland of Thirlestane was created the first Earl of Lauderdale in 1616. John Maitland, 1st Earl of Lauderdale was President of the Council and a Lord of Session. His son was John Maitland, 2nd Earl of Lauderdale who was created Duke of Lauderdale in 1672. The Duke had fought for Charles II of England at the Battle of Worcester in 1651 where he was captured and imprisoned in the Tower of London for nine years. After the Restoration he had risen to become the most powerful man in Scotland and was created a Duke in 1672. However he was also the first and last Duke of Lauderdale. The Duke employed Sir William Bruce to convert his Thirlestane Castle into a renaissance palace.

=== 18th century and Jacobite risings ===
During the Jacobite rising of 1745 the Jacobite leader, Charles Edward Stuart stayed at Thirlestane and his army camped in the parklands after their victory at the Battle of Prestonpans, however the Maitlands were not noted Jacobites and as a result escaped forfeiture.

=== 19th century and Napoleonic wars ===
At the Battle of Waterloo in 1815, General Sir Peregrine Maitland commanded the Foot Guards. Napoleon later surrendered to Captain Frederick Maitland of the Royal Navy. In 1828 the Maitland Club was founded which was a text publication society named after Richard Maitland who was chief of the clan in the 16th century.

== Clan Chief ==
After the death on 2 December 2008 of The Rt. Hon. Sir Patrick Francis Maitland, the chiefdom passed to his son Ian Maitland, Bt, The 18th Earl of Lauderdale, Viscount of Lauderdale, Viscount of Maitland, Lord Maitland of Thirlestane, Lord Thirlestane and Boltoun, 14th Baronet Maitland, Chief of Maitland.

== Clan Castles ==
- Thirlestane Castle is the prime Maitland property in Scotland.
- Tibbers Castle lands were granted 23 August 1369 to john Mautaland of Thirlestane by the Earl of March, whose sister Agnes he married at about that time. His son, Sir Robert Mautaland obtained a crown charter of the land.
- Lennoxlove House, previously Lethington was owned by the Maitlands until 1682; ownership passed to Blantyre-Stewarts; now seat of Dukes of Hamilton since 1946.

Ham House, Richmond, Surrey, property of the Countess of Dysart and Duchess of Lauderdale was largely furnished and decorated by the Duke and Duchess of Lauderdale, but remained in the ownership of the Countess and subsequent Earls of Dysart.

== See also ==
- Scottish clan
