= Frederick Maitland, 14th Earl of Lauderdale =

Scottish peer and landowner

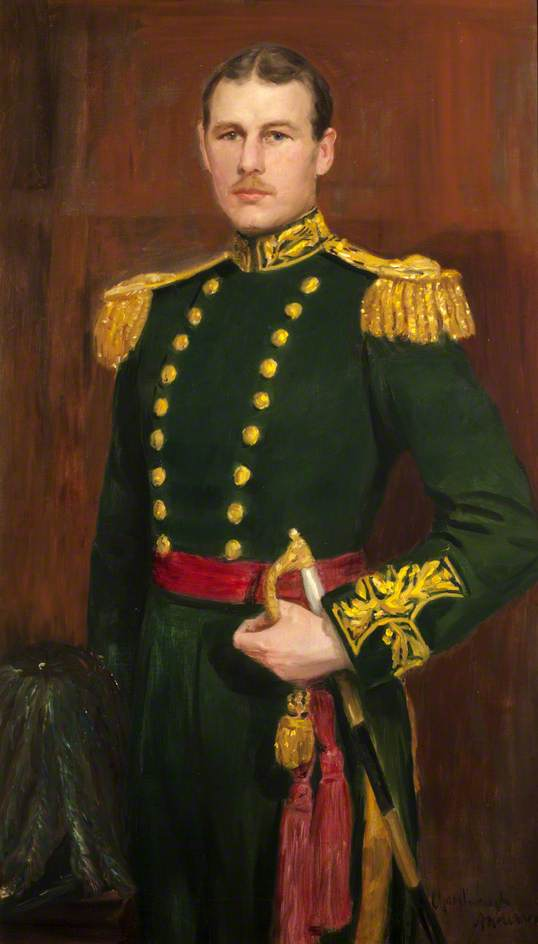
- Tenure: 1924-1931
- Predecessor: Frederick Henry Maitland, 13th Earl of Lauderdale
- Successor: Ian Maitland, 15th Earl of Lauderdale
- Born: Frederick Colin Maitland; 12 April 1868
- Died: 14 September 1931 (aged 63)
- Spouse: Gwendoline Lucy (m. 1890)
- Issue: Ian Maitland, 15th Earl of Lauderdale
- Father: Frederick Henry Maitland, 13th Earl of Lauderdale
- Mother: Charlotte Sleigh

Frederick Colin Maitland, 14th Earl of Lauderdale OBE DL (12 April 1868 – 14 September 1931) was a Scottish peer and landowner. Known by the courtesy title of Viscount Maitland before he inherited the earldom, he fought in the Second Boer War and later in the First World War.

Lauderdale was a Scottish representative peer, with a seat in the House of Lords, from 1929 until his death.

== Life ==
The elder son of the 13th Earl of Lauderdale, by his first wife, Charlotte Sleigh, a daughter of Lieutenant-Colonel Sleigh of the 77th Foot, Maitland was commissioned into the Royal Scots Fusiliers in 1886, transferred to the 2nd Dragoons in 1887 and to the Scots Guards in 1894, from which he retired as a lieutenant. After the outbreak of the Second Boer War in late 1899, he volunteered for active service with the Imperial Yeomanry in South Africa and was appointed adjutant of the 20th battalion on 21 March 1900, leaving Southampton on board the SS Canada in the middle of April 1900. He served in South Africa 1900–1901 and was mentioned in dispatches.

The Rough Riders were established on 27 July 1901 as 1st County of London Imperial Yeomanry (Rough Riders) under the command of Viscount Maitland, promoted to lieutenant-colonel, He saw further active service in the European War of 1914–1918, in which he was wounded. He was appointed OBE in 1919 and succeeded his father in 1924, taking up residence at Thirlestane Castle near Lauder in Scotland.

In 1929 Lauderdale was elected a Representative Peer for Scotland.

In 1890, he married Gwendoline Lucy Vaughan-Williams, a younger daughter of Judge Robert Vaughan-Williams of Bodlonfla, Flintshire, and they had one son, Ian, who succeeded his father in 1931. He was elected a member of the Royal Photographic Society in 1896 and widely exhibited his work and wrote about photography.

== Honours ==
- Member of the Honourable Corps of Gentlemen-at-Arms, 1903
- Ensign of the Royal Company of Archers

== Notes ==
Peerage of Scotland
Preceded by Frederick Maitland	Earl of Lauderdale; 1924–1931	Succeeded by Ian Maitland
