= Ian Maitland, 18th Earl of Lauderdale =

Scottish nobleman and peer

Ian Maitland, 18th Earl of Lauderdale (born 4 November 1937 in Belgrade), styled Master of Lauderdale and Viscount Maitland from 1968 to 2008, is a Scottish peer.

== Early life ==
Maitland is the son of Patrick Maitland, 17th Earl of Lauderdale, and his wife Stanka Lozanic. He was educated at Radley College and Brasenose College, Oxford, graduating BA and MA by seniority.

== Career ==
From 1963 to 1973, he served as a lieutenant in the Royal Naval Reserve. In 1974, he joined National Westminster Bank, rising to become a senior regional manager when he left their employ in 1995. He was director of Maitland Consultancy Services, Ltd. from 1995 to 2007 and a marketing advisor to the London School of Economics from 1995 to 2001.

In 1986, he was appointed a member of the Royal Company of Archers, and in 1998 became a freeman of the City of London and a liveryman of the Worshipful Company of Fan Makers. Maitland succeeded his father in the earldom in 2008, also becoming chief of Clan Maitland and hereditary bearer of the National Flag of Scotland. In 2012, he was appointed a Vice-President of the Royal Stuart Society.

== Marriage and issue ==
On 27 April 1963, Lauderdale married firstly Anne Paule Clark (d. 2020), by whom he has one son and one daughter:

- Lady Sarah Caroline Maitland (b. 26 March 1964), married Stuart G. Parks in 1988. They have two sons:
  - Thomas George Maitland Parks (b. 2 August 1995)
  - Hugh Charles Maitland Parks (b. 28 December 1997)
- John Douglas Maitland, Viscount Maitland, Master of Lauderdale (b. 29 May 1965), married Rosamund Bennett in April 2001 and they were divorced in 2006.

On 10 October 2020, at St Mary's, Bourne Street, Belgravia, Lauderdale married secondly Sarah Lindsay Sasse née Collings, widow of Captain Frederick Hugh Sasse (1924–1987).

Peerage of Scotland
Preceded by Patrick Maitland	Earl of Lauderdale; 2008–present	Incumbent; Heir apparent: John Maitland, Viscount Maitland and Master of Lauderdale
