= Catherine Tollemache, Countess of Sutherland =

English aristocrat

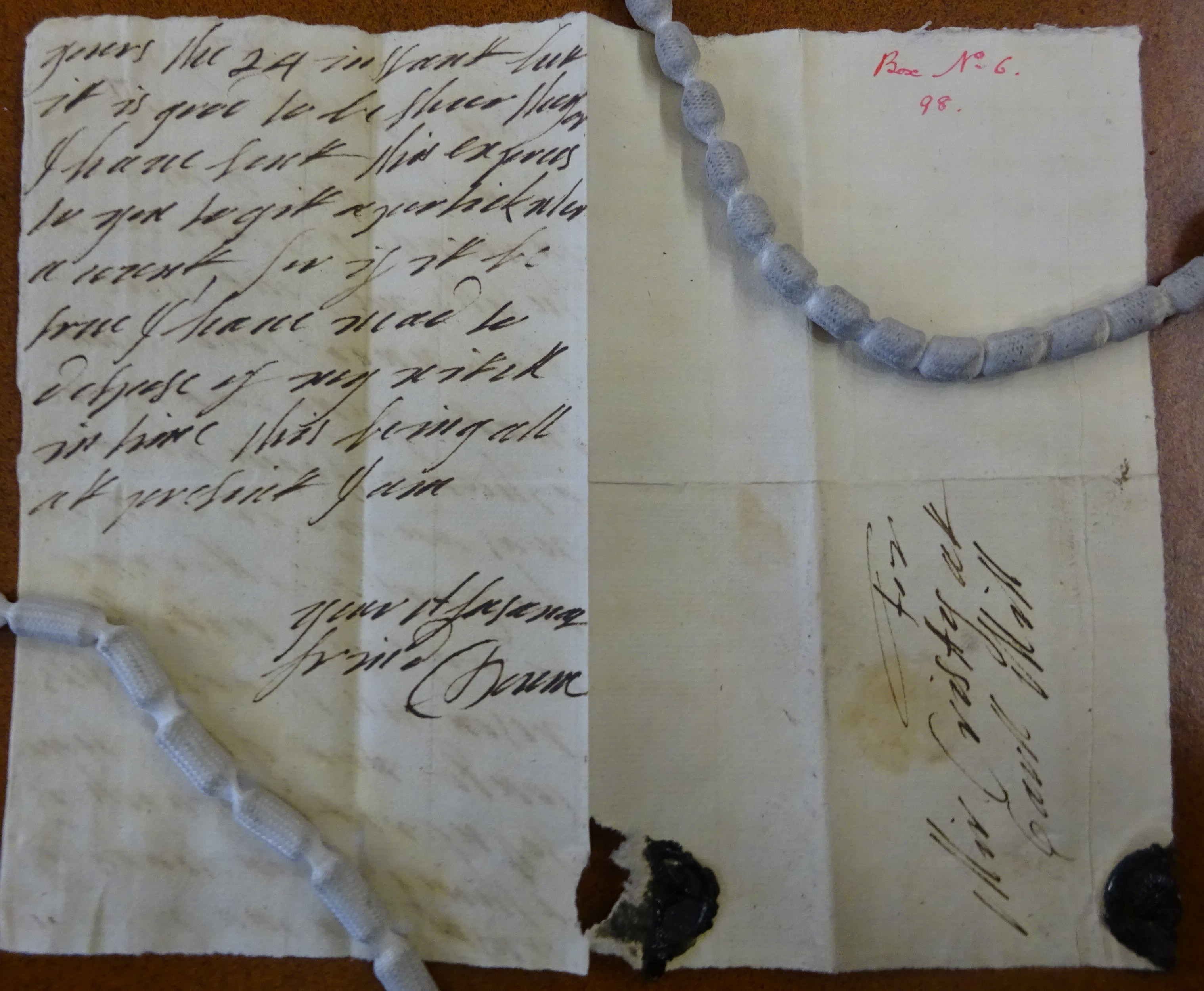
Letter from Catherine Tollemache, signed CDoune to Mr Cristie, (Moray papers)

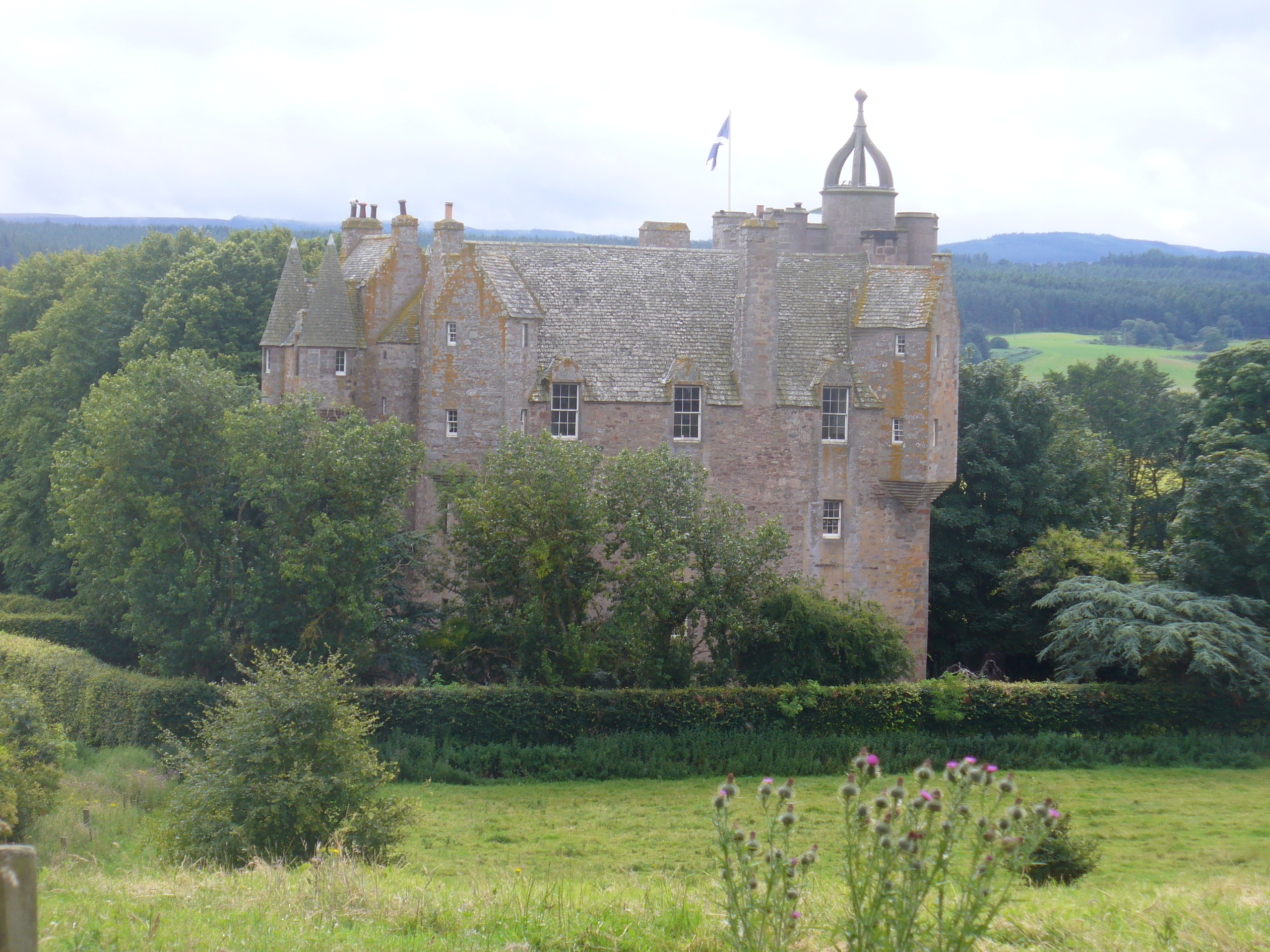
Castle Stuart

Catherine or Katherine Tollemache, Countess of Sutherland (died 1705) was an English aristocrat.

== Life ==
She was a daughter of Lionel Tollemache (sometimes spelled "Talmash") and Elizabeth Murray. Her great-grandmother, Catherine Tollemache née Cromwell (died 1621), is known for her recipe books.

Her mother, and her stepfather, John Maitland, 1st Duke of Lauderdale, came to Edinburgh in July 1677, with Catherine and her sister Elizabeth. Her mother hoped Catherine would marry a son of the Earl of Atholl. However this plan came to nothing, and after making a marriage contract in December 1677, Catherine Tollemache married James Stuart or Stewart, Lord Doune. He was the eldest son of Alexander Stuart, 5th Earl of Moray and Emilia Balfour. Lauderdale was Margaret Home's brother-in-law by his first marriage to Anne Home. Elizabeth Tollemache married Archibald Campbell, 1st Duke of Argyll.

In Scotland, Catherine lived at Moray House in Edinburgh's Canongate, and at Castle Stuart near Ardersier. In the 1690s, she wrote letters to James Cristie the steward of the Earl of Moray at Earlsmill near Darnaway Castle, which she signed with her initials "CD" and "CDoune", as Catherine, Lady Doune. A carpenter in Elgin, William Sinclair, built a barn for her. Timber was sent to her from the Darnaway forests. These were times of poor harvest and famine and are known as the Seven ill years. Cristie kept her letters to account for grain and meal sent to Castle Stuart.

In 1702, she commissioned silver gilt tableware from an Edinburgh goldsmith, Robert Bruce, including a dozen forks and knives, a comparatively early mention of forks (other than forks for dessert) in Britain. The bill was paid in 1706 by her second husband, John Gordon, 16th Earl of Sutherland. Their home was Dunrobin Castle.

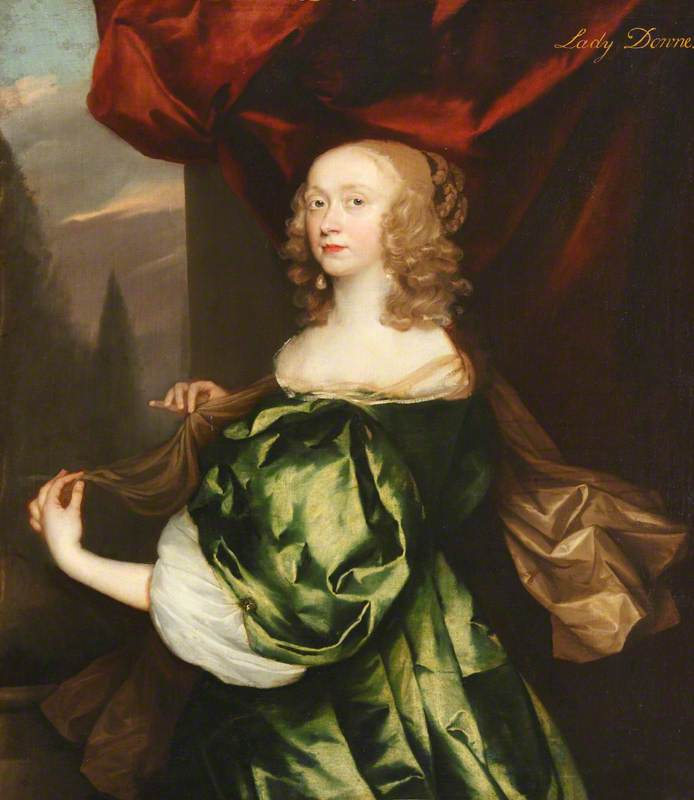
Portrait of Catherine, Lady Doune, inscribed "Lady Doune" at Ham House, but thought to be a portrait of her mother, Elizabeth Maitland, Duchess of Lauderdale.

She died in 1705. The Earl of Sutherland subsequently married Frances Hodgson (died 1732), a daughter of Thomas Hodgson of Bramwith Hall and former wife of Sir Thomas Travell.

== Portrait ==
An inventory of Ham House, the home of her mother, mentions a portrait of Katherine, Lady Doune, as the work of Lodewijk van der Helst. A portrait labelled "Lady Doune", possibly by John Weesop, survives at Ham, but the picture depicts her mother Elizabeth Murray.

== Children ==
She was the mother of:

- Elizabeth Stuart (died 1708), who married Alexander Grant of Grant.
- Emilia Stuart (died 1711), who married (1) Alexander Fraser of Strichen, and (2) John Lindsay, 19th Earl of Crawford
