= Earl of Dysart =

Scottish noble title

Earldom of Dysart
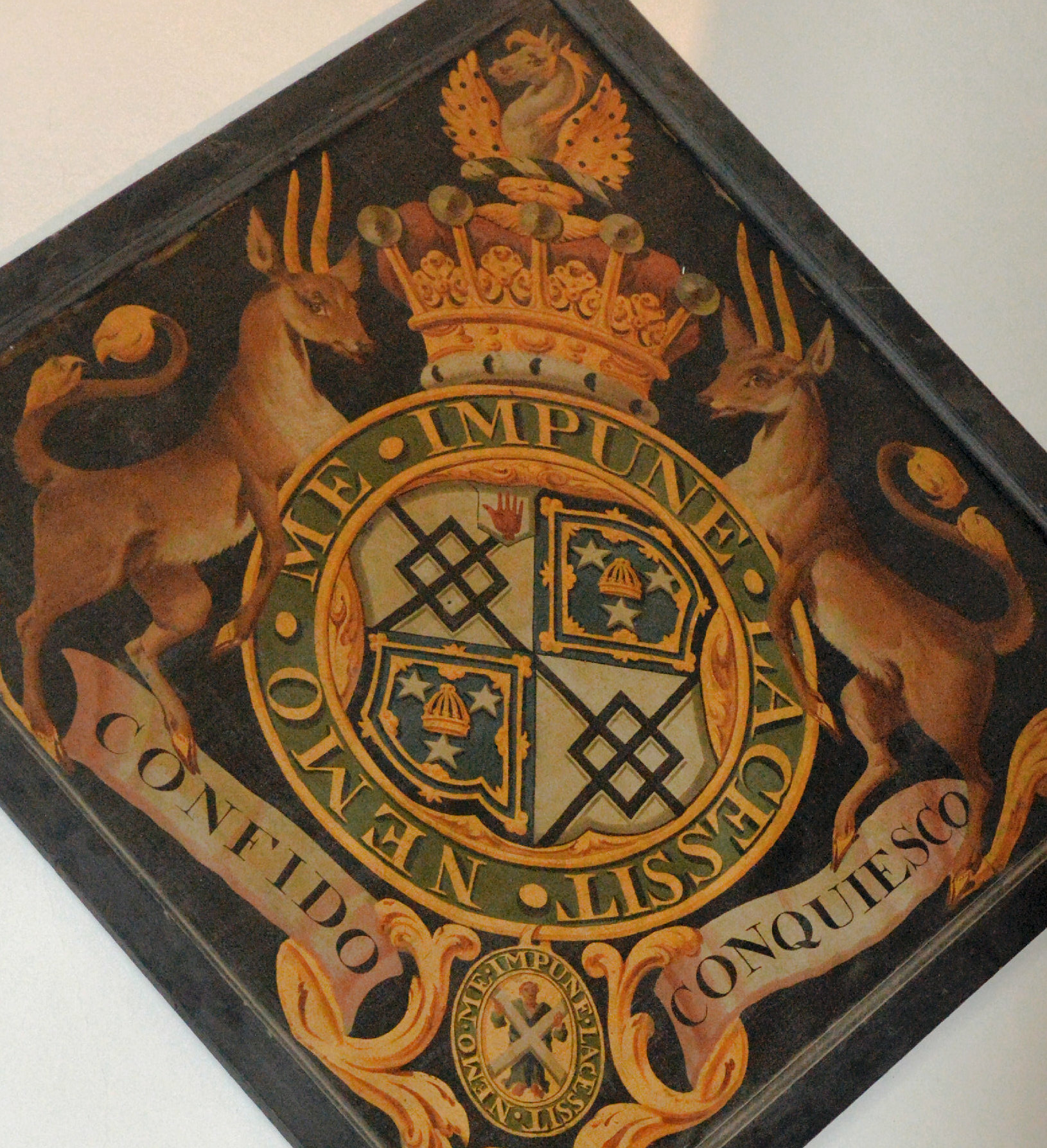
- Arms of Lionel Tollemache, 4th Earl of Dysart
- Creation date: 3 August 1643
- Created by: King Charles I
- Peerage: Peerage of Scotland
- First holder: William Murray
- Present holder: John Peter Grant of Rothiemurchus, 13th Earl
- Heir apparent: James Patrick Grant, Lord Huntingtower
- Remainder to: 2nd Countess's heirs of the body lawfully begotten, failing which to her heirs whatsoever
- Subsidiary titles: Lord Huntingtower

Earl of Dysart (pronounced /ˈdaɪzərt/) is a title in the Peerage of Scotland. It was created by King Charles I in 1643 for William Murray and has been held continuously since then by his relatives.

== Creation ==
The title was granted in 1643 to William Murray, who had earlier represented Fowey and East Looe in the English House of Commons. He was made Lord Huntingtower at the same time, also in the Peerage of Scotland. Murray had been a lifelong friend of King Charles I, in fact having been his whipping boy while the latter was Prince of Wales.

== Succession ==
Murray was succeeded by his daughter, Elizabeth, the 2nd Countess. In 1670 she resigned the peerage and received a new grant thereof by patent with precedency of her father, and with remainder to her heirs of the body, failing which to her heirs whatsoever. Lady Dysart married, firstly, Sir Lionel Tollemache, 3rd Baronet (see Tollemache baronets for the earlier history of this title), and, secondly, John Maitland, 1st Duke of Lauderdale. She was succeeded by her son from her first marriage, Lionel, the 3rd Earl, who had already succeeded his father as 4th Baronet. Lord Dysart notably represented Orford and Suffolk in the House of Commons and served as Lord-Lieutenant of Suffolk, but declined the offer of an English barony. His son, Lionel Tollemache, Lord Huntingtower pre-deceased him and the title was inherited by his grandson, Lionel Tollemache, 4th Earl of Dysart in 1727. The 4th Earl was elected High Steward of Ipswich and Knight of the Thistle. The title passed to the 4th Earl's eldest son, Lionel, who became 5th Earl in 1770. The 5th Earl died without issue in 1799 and the title passed to his brother, Wilbraham, former Member of Parliament for Northampton and Liskeard, who became the 6th Earl at the age of 60.

The Tollemache baronetcy became extinct in 1821 when Wilbraham died leaving no direct descendants. The Scottish titles were inherited by the 5th and 6th Earls' sister, Louisa Tollemache, the 7th Countess, widow of John Manners, then aged 75. On succeeding to the titles Lady Dysart assumed by Royal licence the surname and arms of Tollemache (or Talmash).

Louisa's eldest son and heir apparent, William Tollemache, Lord Huntingtower, was created a Baronet, of Hanby Hall in the County of Lincoln, in the Baronetage of Great Britain in 1793. However, he predeceased his mother and Lady Dysart was succeeded by her grandson, Lionel the 8th Earl (the son of Lord Huntingtower), who had already succeeded his father as 2nd Baronet. Lionel represented Ilchester in Parliament 1827–30. Lionel's son, William Tollemache, Lord Huntingtower, predeceased him in 1872 and, on his death in 1878, was succeeded by his grandson, William, the 9th Earl, Lord-Lieutenant of Rutland.

On the death of the 9th Earl the baronetcy and Scottish peerages separated. The baronetcy was inherited by a male heir, Lyonel, (see Tollemache Baronets for later history of this title) while the lordship and earldom passed to his niece Wynefryde Agatha, the 10th Countess (1889–1975). She was the daughter of Agnes Mary Manners Talmash (sister of the 9th Earl) and her husband Charles Norman Lindsay Tollemache Scott.

Lady Dysart married Owain Edward Whitehead Greaves and was succeeded in 1975 by their eldest daughter Rosamund Agnes Greaves (1914–2003), the 11th Countess. In 2003 her sister Katherine Grant of Rothiemurchus (1918–2011), the widow of Lieutenant-Colonel John Peter Grant of Rothiemurchus MBE, became the 12th Countess. As of 2021 the titles are held by her only son, the 13th Earl, who succeeded his mother in 2011.

The family seat is now The Doune of Rothiemurchus, near Aviemore, Inverness-shire.

== Earls of Dysart (1643/1670) ==
- 1643: William Murray, 1st Earl of Dysart (c.1600–1655)
- 1655: Elizabeth Tollemache, 2nd Countess of Dysart (1626–1698)
- 1698: Lionel Tollemache, 3rd Earl of Dysart (1649–1727)
- 1727: Lionel Tollemache, 4th Earl of Dysart (1708–1770)
- 1770: Lionel Tollemache, 5th Earl of Dysart (1734–1799)
- 1799: Wilbraham Tollemache, 6th Earl of Dysart (1739–1821)
- 1821: Louisa Tollemache, 7th Countess of Dysart (1745–1840)
- 1840: Lionel William John Tollemache, 8th Earl of Dysart (1794–1878)
- 1878: William John Manners Tollemache, 9th Earl of Dysart (1859–1935)
- 1935: Wenefryde Agatha Scott, 10th Countess of Dysart (1889–1975)
- 1975: Rosamund Agnes Greaves, 11th Countess of Dysart (1914–2003)
- 2003: Katherine Grant of Rothiemurchus, 12th Countess of Dysart (1918–2011)
- 2011: John Peter Grant of Rothiemurchus, 13th Earl of Dysart (b. 1946)

The heir apparent is the present holder's only son, James Patrick Grant of Rothiemurchus, Lord Huntingtower (b. 1977).
The heir apparent's heir apparent is his son, John Peter Grant of Rothiemurchus, Master of Huntingtower (b. 2011).

== See also ==
- Baron Tollemache
- Tollemache baronets
- Tollemache family

== Sources ==
- Hesilrige, Arthur G. M. (1921). Debrett's Peerage and Titles of courtesy. London: Dean & Son. p. 329.
- Kidd, Charles, Williamson, David (editors). Debrett's Peerage and Baronetage (1990 edition). New York: St Martin's Press, 1990,
