= Katherine Grant, 12th Countess of Dysart =

Scottish peeress

The Right Honourable The Countess of Dysart
- Born: Katherine Greaves; 1 June 1918; North Wales
- Died: 8 November 2011 (aged 93); Inverness-shire, Scotland
- Spouse: John Peter Grant
- Children: Lady Jane Margery Grant; John Grant, 13th Earl of Dysart
- Parents: Owain Edward Whitehead Greaves (father); Wenefryde Scott, 10th Countess of Dysart (mother)

Katherine Grant, 12th Countess of Dysart (1 June 1918 – 8 November 2011) was a Scottish peeress.

== Biography ==
She was born Katherine Greaves, daughter of Major Owain Edward Whitehead Greaves and Wenefryde Agatha Greaves, who succeeded as 10th Countess of Dysart (1889–1975) in 1935. On her mother's death Lady Katherine's elder sister, Lady Rosamund Agnes (1914–2003) became the 11th Countess of Dysart, but never married or had issue; on her death in December 2003 Lady Katherine succeeded to the titles of Countess of Dysart and Lady Huntingtower.

In 1941, she married Lieutenant-Colonel John Peter Grant younger of Rothiemurchus (1915–1987), who succeeded his father as 15th Grant of Rothiemurchus. They had two children:

- Lady Jane Margery Grant (2 February 1943 - 13 June 2015); she married Andrew Robert Fowell Buxton in 1965.
- John Grant, 13th Earl of Dysart (born 22 October 1946), later her successor as Earl of Dysart and owner of the Rothiemurchus estate; on 8 May 1971 he married Philippa Chance, by whom he has three children.

The Countess died on 8 November 2011, aged 93. Her son Johnnie (John Peter Grant) then became the 13th Earl of Dysart while his son James, as heir to the earldom, became Lord Huntingtower.

Peerage of Scotland
Preceded by Rosamund Greaves	Countess of Dysart; 2003–2011	Succeeded by John Grant
