= Alexander Marshal =

English entomologist and artist (c.1620–1682)

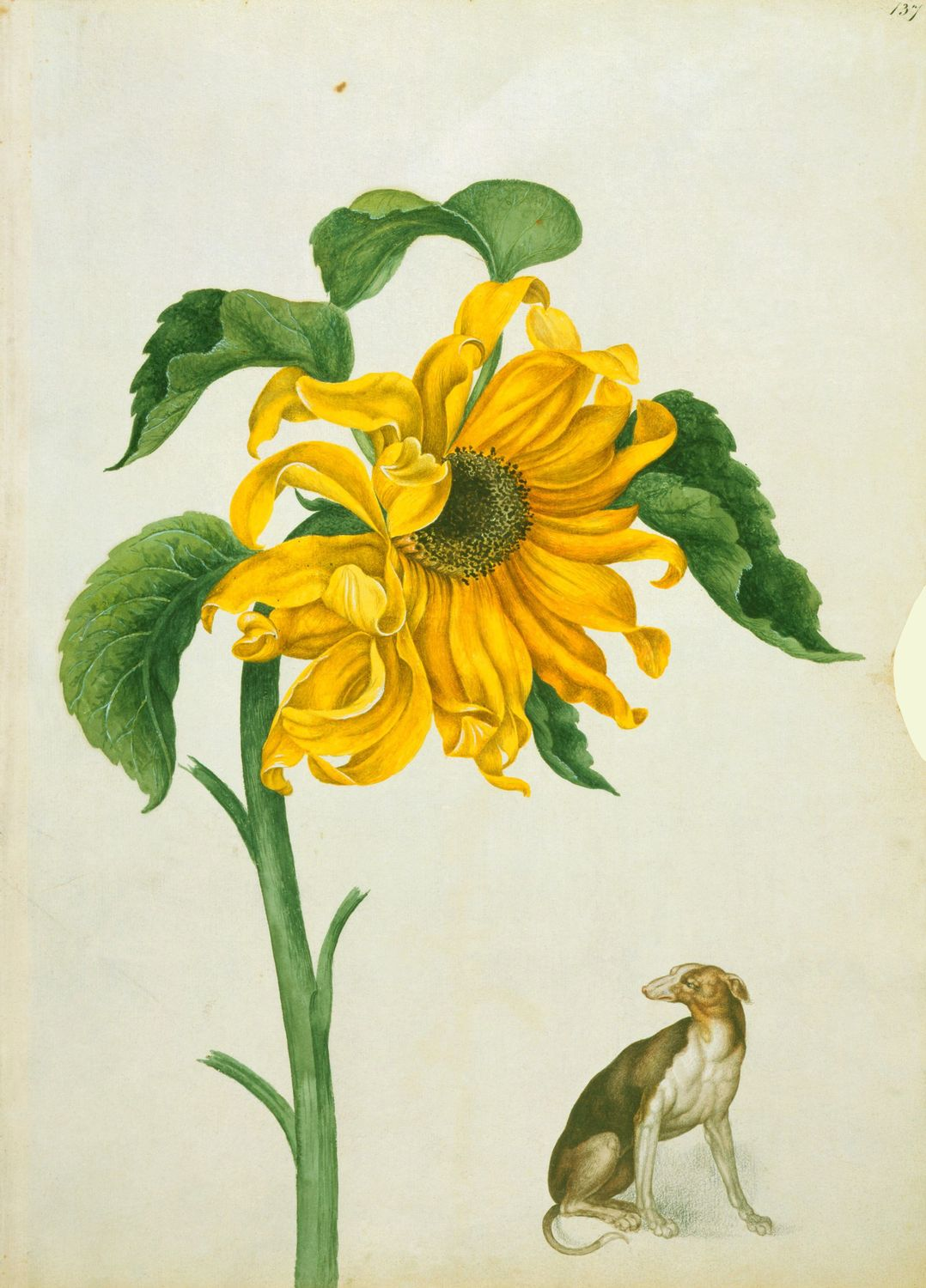
Common sunflower and greyhound, from the florilegium now in The Royal Collection

Alexander Marshal (c.1620 – 7 December 1682 in London) was an English entomologist, gardener and botanical artist, noted for four albums of paintings, including the florilegium he compiled, consisting of some 160 folios of plants cultivated in English gardens, and finally presented to George IV in the 1820s.

Marshal belonged to a coterie of gentleman gardeners from London, who cultivated and studied rare plants. These previously unknown species were introduced to England from the Near East and the New World in the 1600s. Marshal worked on his florilegium for some thirty years, and despite his not being a professional artist, his book boasts some of the most pleasing images in botanical art - it is now part of The Royal Collection, at the Royal Library at Windsor Castle. The plates depict more than 600 plant species, and detailed studies of insects, birds and mammals. It is notable as being the only known surviving florilegium by an English artist from the 1600s.

Samuel Hartlib, the German polymath, wrote that Marshal had by 1650 produced a florilegium for the botanist and gardener John Tradescant the Younger. It was catalogued as "A Book of Mr Tradescant's choicest Flowers and Plants, exquisitely limned in vellum, by Mr. Alex. Marshal", by the Musaeum Tradescantianum in 1656 and is now lost. Another album, of thirty-three paintings on vellum, is in the British Museum.

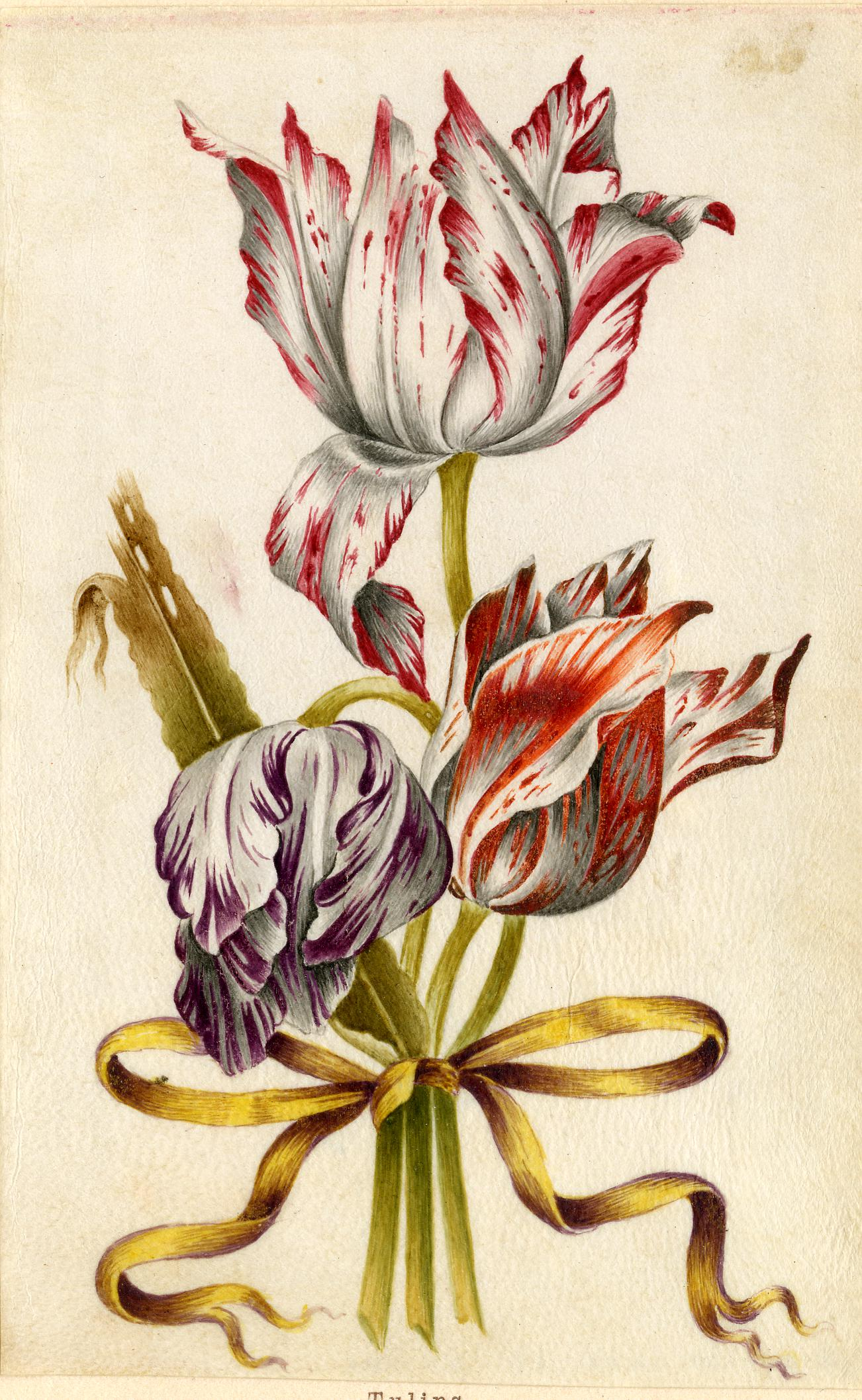
A plate from the album in the British Museum

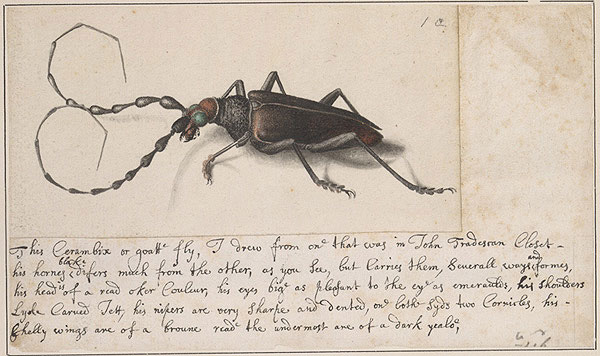
Longhorn beetle

Though long known as a botanical illustrator, his talent in depicting insects only came to light in 1980. His album of 63 folios has 129 watercolours of a variety of insects – butterflies, moths, caterpillars, beetles, locusts, spiders, flies, and crickets – some by other artists. it is now in the Academy of Natural Sciences of Drexel University, in Philadelphia. On the reverse side of his drawings are notes in his own hand, providing much autobiographical material. Marshal described his Lepidopterid subjects in meticulous detail. He enlisted the aid of Tradescant, and of his friend Henry Compton, Bishop of London, in acquiring many rare, exotic insects.

Marshal was described as an accomplished painter of flowers and fruit in Sir William Sanderson's Graphice of 1658. His experimenting with pigments led to their being extracted from flowers, berries, gums, and roots, as well as verdigris and arsenic. He painted for the pleasure it gave to him and his horticulturist friends. William Freind, Marshal's great nephew and heir, wrote of him as having "an independent fortune and painting merely for his amusement". He believed that plants could only be understood if they were grown to reveal their complete life-cycle.

Earlier in his life he operated as a merchant, living for some time in France. His earliest surviving dated work is a miniature of Catherine Murray, Countess of Dysart of Ham House from 1649. He is recorded living at Ham in 1650, London in 1651, and Islington in 1654, staying there with the son of an Alderman Dewes. In 1667 he wrote to the Royal Society from Castle Ashby, the seat of James Compton, 3rd Earl of Northampton. His final years were spent at Fulham Palace, the home of the earls' brother Bishop Compton, from 1675 until his death there on 7 December 1682. He left behind a childless widow, Dorothea (whom he married on 26 July 1678), the daughter of Francis Smith. He was buried at All Saints Church, Fulham, in front of the altar, where an inscription on his tombstone reads, in part:

He left no issue, but, by reason of his integrity and gifts he will live longer than the life which was vouchsafed him.

When Dorothea died in 1711, she bequeathed Marshal's florilegium to her nephew Robert Freind. It was sold at auction in 1777 and presented to George IV sometime after 1820.

A selection of Marshal's works was shown at the "Amazing Rare Things: The Art of Natural History in the Age of Discovery" exhibition at The Queen's Gallery, Buckingham Palace, curated by David Attenborough.

== Bibliography ==
- Leith-Ross, Prudence; McBurney, Henrietta (2000). The Florilegium of Alexander Marshal at Windsor Castle. ISBN 978-1902163055.
- Leith-Ross, Prudence; McBurney, Henrietta (2008). Mr. Marshal's Flower book. Alexander Marshal (illustrator). ISBN 978-1905686032.
