= John Grant, 13th Earl of Dysart =

Scottish peer and landowner

The Right Honourable The Earl of Dysart
- Born: 22 October 1946 (age 79); Great Britain
- Title: 13th Earl of Dysart
- Predecessor: Katherine Grant, 12th Countess of Dysart
- Spouse: Philippa Chance
- Parents: Lt Col John Peter Grant, 16th of Rothiemurchus (father); Katherine Grant, 12th Countess of Dysart (mother)

John Peter Grant, 13th Earl of Dysart DL FRGS FRSGS (born 22 October 1946), styled Lord Huntingtower from 2003 to 2011, also known as Johnnie Grant, is a Scottish peer and landowner.

== Biography ==
Dysart is the son of Lt Col John Peter Grant MBE, 16th of Rothiemurchus, and his wife Lady Katherine, née Greaves.

Dysart was appointed a deputy lieutenant of Inverness-shire in 1986, and succeeded his father as 'of Rothiemurchus', in the Cairngorms, in 1987. He has held office in a number of co-operative, land management, nature and conservation organisations since 1975 and was President of the Royal Zoological Society of Scotland from 1996 to 2006. In 2003, his mother Lady Katherine succeeded her elder sister, Lady Rosamund, as Countess of Dysart. Upon her death in 2011, Dysart inherited her titles.

Together with his son James, he is responsible for Rothiemurchus, in the Scottish Highlands, including part of Rothiemurchus Forest and Braeriach, which at 4252 ft (1296 m) is the third highest mountain in Britain.

=== Marriage and issue ===
In 1971, Dysart married Philippa Chance MBE (16 August 1949 – 16 September 2022), by whom he has three children:

- Louisa Katherine Lindsay (b. 1975)
- James Patrick Grant (b. 1977), styled as Lord Huntingtower in 2011, married Dr Daisy Ziani de Ferranti, by whom he has one child: John Peter Grant (b. 2011)
- Alexandra Rose Grant (b. 1985)

The Countess of Dysart was appointed Member of the British Empire for services to NHS Scotland. She also had a long and close involvement with rural development in the North of Scotland, particularly through community action. She was a founder and director of Moray, Badenoch and Strathspey Enterprise Co. Ltd. The character Molly in the BBC series Monarch of the Glen was based on the countess. She was killed following a collision with a coach in 2022.

Peerage of Scotland
Preceded by Katherine Grant	Earl of Dysart; 2011–present	Incumbent
