= Isabel Seton, Countess of Lauderdale =

Scottish noblewoman (1594–1638)

Isabel Seton Countess of Lauderdale
- Born: 1594
- Died: 1638 (aged 43–44)
- Known for: Embroidery on natural and classical themes
- Title: Countess of Lauderdale
- Spouse: John Maitland, 1st Earl of Lauderdale
- Children: 15, four survived infancy: John Maitland, 1st Duke of Lauderdale; Robert Maitland; Charles Maitland, 3rd Earl of Lauderdale
- Parents: Lilias Drummond; Alexander Seton, 1st Earl of Dunfermline

Isabel (or Isobel) Seton (1594–1638) was a Scottish noblewoman known for her embroidery, which was the subject of nine neo-Latin epigrams by the Scottish poet Arthur Johnston.

== Life and Family ==
Born in 1594, Isabel Seton was the second of five daughters born to Lilias Drummond and Alexander Seton, 1st Earl of Dunfermline. She married John Maitland, the second Lord Maitland of Thirlestane (died 1645), who was created Earl of Lauderdale in 1624. On the 18 June 1610, she and her husband were granted a charter of the lands of Gilbertoun and others.

Seton gave birth to fifteen children, seven sons and eight daughters, of whom only four survived. In August 1632, Lauderdale wrote from Thirlestane Castle to the Countess of Home that Isabel was unwell, and although she "was never a verie readie wrytter to hir freindes" she had managed to pen a letter to the Countess of Roxburghe with the help of her eldest son John.

Her eldest son John Maitland became a prominent Scottish politician who was made Duke of Lauderdale in 1672. She died on 2 November 1638 and is buried in Haddington, East Lothian, where there is a monument with a Latin inscription to her memory.

== Embroidery ==
While Seton's tapestries (embroideries) do not survive, they were celebrated in a series of nine neo-Latin epigrams written by the Scottish poet Arthur Johnston and published in the Delitiae Poetarum Scotorum (1637). In these epigrams, Johnston uses classical allusions to celebrate Seton's embroidery.

Johnston associates her closely with Minerva, the Roman goddess of weaving, and the first and last epigrams describe her as 'the Minerva of Lauderdale' (Minervae...Laderdeliae). Epigrams 2-7 praise her marvellous and naturalistic depiction of flowers, fruits, animals, birds, fish, and the planets, which are pictured in the guise of Roman gods. The eighth epigram describes Seton's portrayal of the Roman heroine Lucretia.
