= Catherine Murray, Countess of Dysart =

Peer in the Scottish Peerage

The Right Honourable The Countess of Dysart
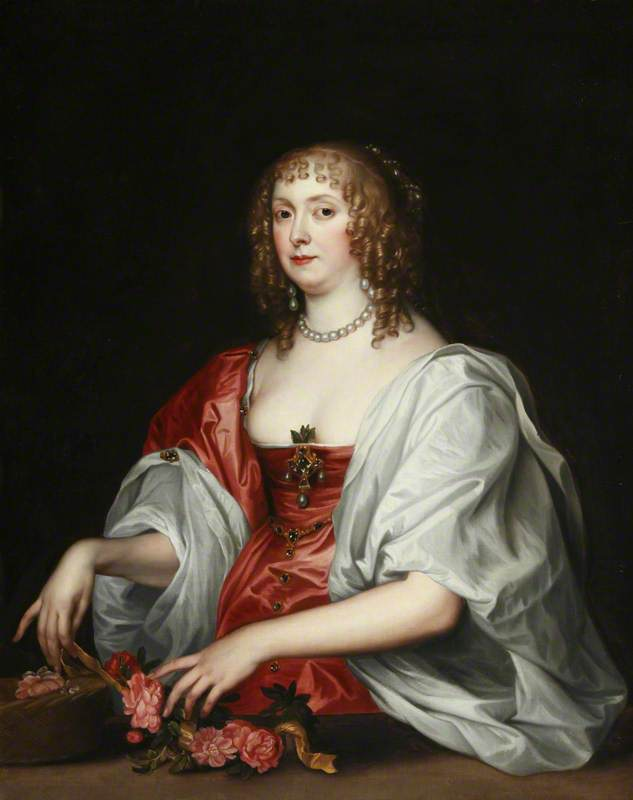
- Catherine Bruce, Mrs William Murray, Anthony van Dyck (1599-1641) (after)
- Born: Clackmannan
- Died: 2 August 1649
- Buried: Petersham Parish Church
- Spouse: William Murray, 1st Earl of Dysart
- Issue: Elizabeth Maitland, Duchess of Lauderdale; Katherine Murray; Anne Murray; Margaret Murray, Lady Maynard
- Parents: Col. Norman Bruce; Janet Norvell

Catherine Murray, Countess of Dysart (née Bruce, also known as Katherine; died 2 August 1649) was a Scottish noblewoman. She was wife of William Murray, 1st Earl of Dysart and mother of Elizabeth, Duchess of Lauderdale. She was responsible for the management of Ham House during the English Civil War, defending it from the encroachment of Parliamentary forces. She was portrayed by prominent artists such as Anthony van Dyck and John Hoskins.

== Early life ==
Catherine was the daughter of Col. Norman Bruce and his wife Janet Norvell. Norman Bruce was the second son of the 8th Baron of Clackmannan. Catherine was part of a family that could trace its lineage to Robert Bruce, King of Scotland.

== Marriage and family ==
In the mid-1620s, Catherine married William Murray, the son of the parson of Dysart, Fife, who could trace his lineage to James II of Scotland. Elizabeth, their eldest child, was baptised at St. Martin-in-the-Fields on 28 Sep 1626. She went on to have 4 more daughters, one of whom died in 1636. In 1626, William was made Gentleman of the Bedchamber by Charles I and the family moved to Ham House near Richmond. Catherine was made a Lady-in-waiting to Queen Henrietta Maria. When William initiated a program of renovation to elevate Ham House to the highest standard of courtly taste, Catherine furnished the house with richly-embroidered silk textiles and leather wall hangings.

The outbreak of the Civil War took William from his family in service of the King, leaving Catherine to manage the family and estate. In 1641, William transferred ownership of the Ham House estate to Catherine, under the supervision of trustees led by Thomas Bruce, 1st Lord Elgin as a means of safeguarding their assets. She and her daughters did manage to visit the court occasionally while it resided at Oxford, up the Thames from Ham House. Being part of a prominent Royalist family, she attracted the attention of Parliament, who accused her in 1643 of secretly funneling funds to the King. She successfully rebuffed the accusation, but was subject to threats of sequestration in the years that followed. Despite those challenges, Catherine took her daughters to the Oxford court for the winter of 1643–44. She also continued to entertain at Ham House, with Thomas Knyvett noting in May 1644 that he was "kindly intertainde" by a "very fine discreet Lady." This discretion served her well while traveling abroad in 1645 - to the Netherlands and France as well as Scotland - to visit her husband while he was in service of the King, as she managed to avoid arousing the suspicions of the Parliamentary authorities. A landing permit which was required for her return to England, was signed by Lord Warwick, who would not have done so if she was believed to have been undertaking espionage. After her return to England, a final attempt to seize the Ham House estate was made, which Catherine won after months of persistent struggle.

== Portraits ==
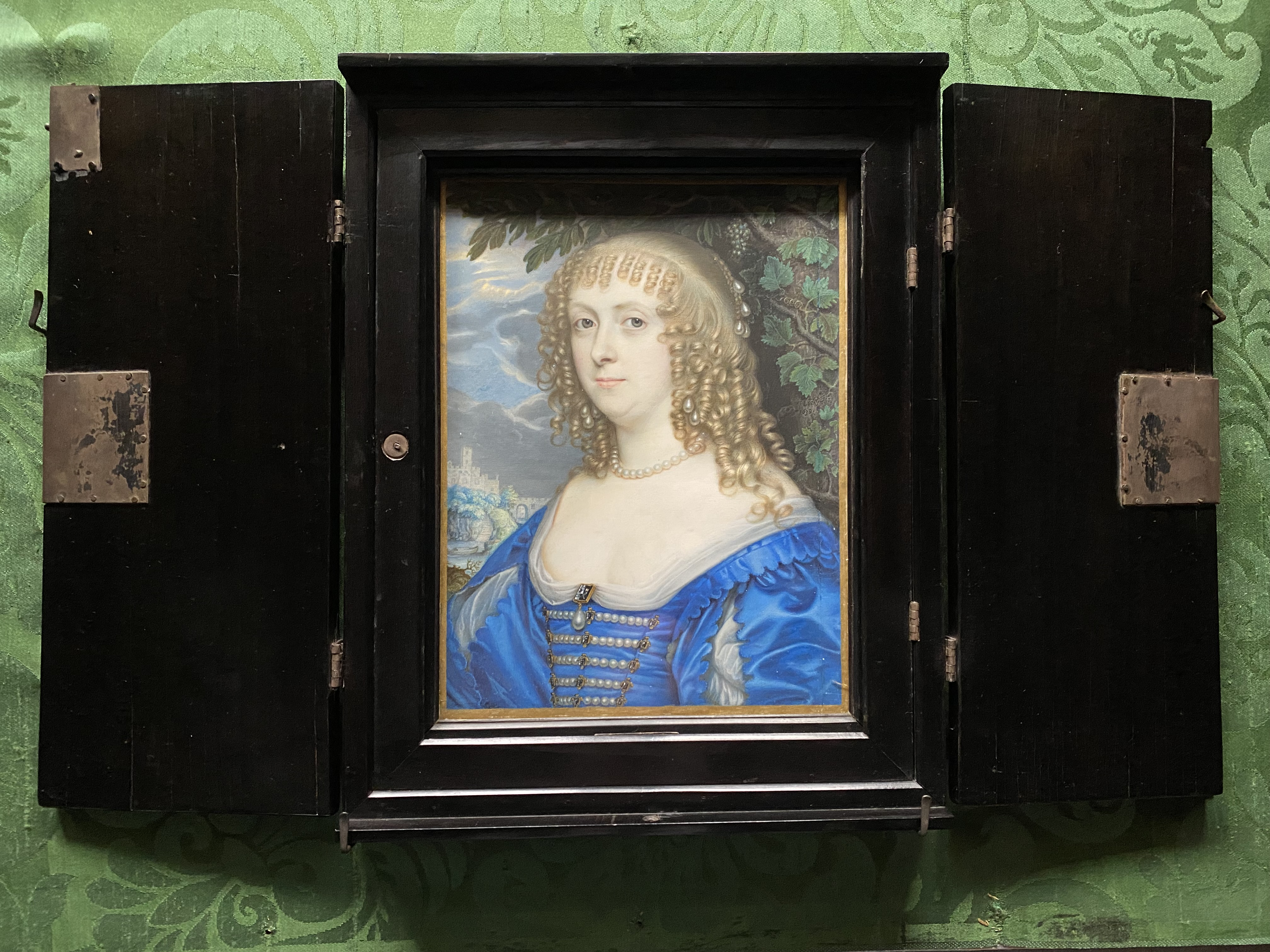
Catherine Bruce, Mrs William Murray and Countess of Dysart (d.1649) by John Hoskins the elder, 1638

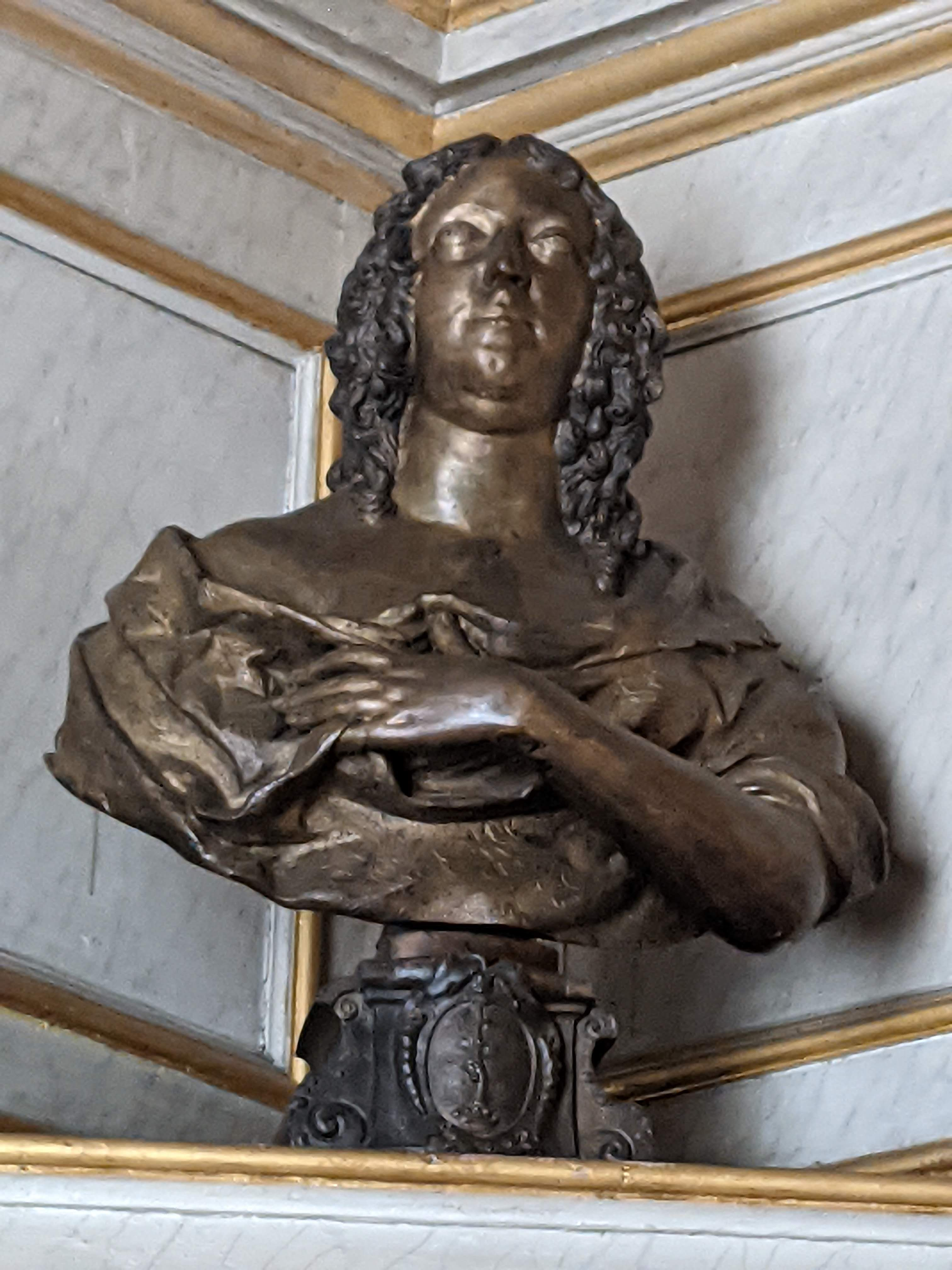
Bronze bust by Peter Besnier

Catherine was portrayed by several notable artists of the day.

- A 1638 miniature portrait by John Hoskins the elder, considered to be his finest work as well as one of his largest. The portrait remains in its ebony frame with silver mounts and is signed and dated 1638, showing the countess in a blue satin dress richly trimmed with pearls, in a landscape with a castle in the background. A 1649 copy of this work by Alexander Marshal includes an image of Ham House in the background instead of the castle, serving as an important architectural reference for the property.
- A portrait by Anthony Van Dyck now hangs at Petworth House, which was home to the 10th Earl of Northumberland, who was known to the Murray family. The painting was one of a series commissioned to honour the leading ladies of court, which was destined for the Earl's London home.
- Peter Besnier created a bronze bust of Catherine, which remains in the White Closet at Ham House. Besnier was part of a family of French sculptors in service to the royal family and a student of Hubert Le Sueur, to whom the bust was previous attributed.

== Death ==
In 1648, Catherine transferred ownership of the Ham House estate to Elizabeth and her husband Lionel Tollemache. Catherine had fallen ill and wrote to Lord Elgin asking his continued support of her daughters in the event of her death. She died on 2 August 1649 and was buried at Petersham Church. Her burial plate, which was gifted to the NT by Sir Humphrey Tollemache in 1976 excludes her title of Countess of Dysart, but mentions that "the whole funerall was celebrated with all fiting solemnitie according to her degree." (Note: Catherine Murray did not use her title during her lifetime, as the title did not pass the Great Seal until 1651.)

== Sources ==
- Cripps, Doreen (1975). Elizabeth of the Sealed Knot: a Biography of Elizabeth Murray, Countess of Dysart. Kineton, Warwickshire: Roundwood Press. ISBN 978-0-900-09343-2. OCLC 1937689.
- Mosley, Charles (2003). Burke's Peerage, Baronetage and Knightage (107th ed.). Stokesley: Burke's Peerage & Gentry. ISBN 9780971196629.
- Pritchard, Evelyn (2007). Ham House and its Owners through Five Centuries 1610–2006. London: Richmond Local History Society. ISBN 978-1-955-07172-7. OCLC 1118277705.
- Roundell, Julia (Mrs. Charles) (1904). Ham House, its History and Art Treasures. London: G. Bell and Sons. OCLC 862863319.
- Rowell, Christopher, ed. (2013). Ham House: 400 Years of Collecting and Patronage. Paul Mellon Centre for Studies in British Art. New Haven, CT / London: Yale University Press. ISBN 978-0-300-18540-9. OCLC 930829576.
- Schofield, Bertram (1949). The Knyvett Letters, 1620-1644. Norfolk Record Society. OCLC 1231461.
- Smuts, R. Malcolm (2004). "Murray, William, First Earl of Dysart (d. 1655), Courtier". Oxford Dictionary of National Biography. Oxford Dictionary of National Biography (online ed.). Oxford University Press. doi:10.1093/ref:odnb/19653. (Subscription, Wikipedia Library access or UK public library membership required.)
