= Wenefryde Scott, 10th Countess of Dysart =

British peeress

The Right Honorable The Countess of Dysart
- Born: 13 November 1889
- Died: 2 June 1975 (aged 85)
- Spouse: Major Owain Edward Whitehead Greaves
- Children: Rosamund Greaves, 11th Countess of Dysart; Katherine Grant, 12th Countess of Dysart; Mary Greaves
- Parents: Charles Norman Scott (father); Agnes Mary Tollemache (mother)

Wenefryde Agatha Scott, 10th Countess of Dysart (13 November 1889 – 2 June 1975) was a British peeress.

== Family ==
Wenefryde was the daughter of Charles Norman Scott (1853–1938) and Agnes Mary Tollemache (1855–1912). Scott was a JP for the Stewartry of Kirkcudbright and a JP and DL for Leicestershire. Her mother was one of the daughters of the controversial William Tollemache, Lord Huntingtower (1820–1872) and received the precedence of an earl's daughter in a warrant of precedence granted in 1881.

== Marriage and issue ==
Wenefryde's coming-out ball was hosted by her uncle, the 9th Earl of Dysart, at his seat at Ham House. Wenyfryde married Major Owain Edward Whitehead Greaves of the Royal Horse Guards, grandson of the slate mine proprietor John Whitehead Greaves, on 4 January 1913. They had three daughters; Rosamund (15 February 1914 – December 2003), Katherine (1 June 1918 – 8 November 2011) and Mary (22 September 1921 – 22 February 1955).

== Estate ==
Following the death of her mother in 1912, and Wenefryde's marriage soon after, Wenefryde inherited the Bosworth estate. This had been bought by her father but assigned to her mother as part of their marriage settlement. Wenefryde sold the estate and moved to Wales whilst her father retired to Ampney St Peter, Gloucestershire.

She inherited the Scottish title of 10th Countess of Dysart, suo jure, on the death of her uncle William Tollemache, 9th Earl of Dysart, who died without issue in 1935. The inheritance brought with it further estate; the Leicestershire property including 26,445 acres (10,702 ha).

In 1939, Wenefryde purchased Stobo Castle, its ancient feudal barony and lands but rarely inhabited the castle due to the onset of war. Owain died there on 18 February 1941. Parts of the wider estate were sold off over the following three decades and the castle and garden went into a slow decline. The Countess lived at Stobo until the mid-1960s, after which it lay empty until sold at auction by Sothebys in 1972.

Wenefryde Agatha Scott died on 2 June 1975 and the Dysart title passed to her eldest daughter, Rosamund.

Peerage of Scotland
Preceded by William Tollemache	Countess of Dysart; 1935–1975	Succeeded by Rosamund Greaves
