= John Maitland, 1st Earl of Lauderdale =

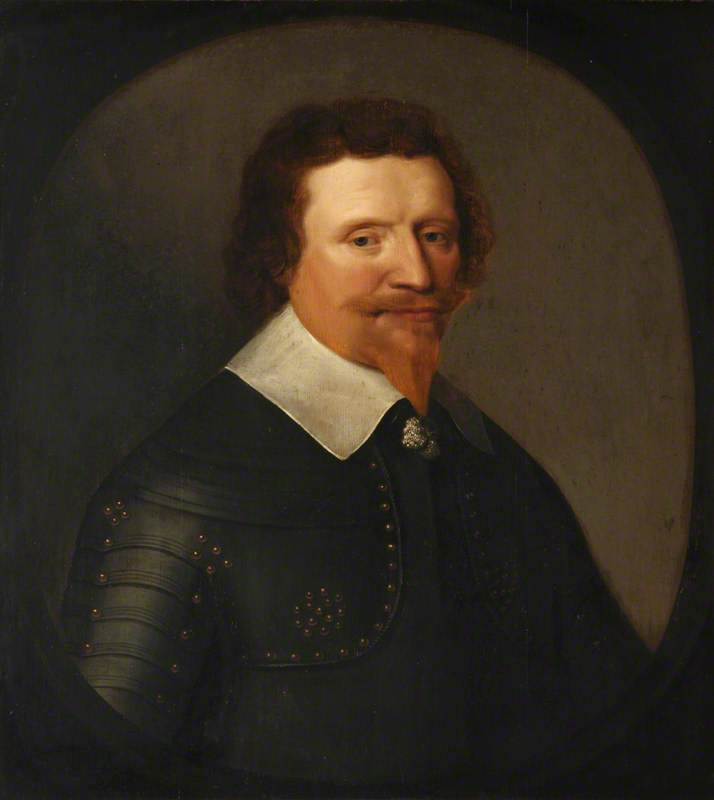
Image of John Maitland

John Maitland, 1st Earl of Lauderdale, Viscount of Lauderdale, Viscount Maitland, and Lord Thirlestane and Boltoun, (died January 1645) was President of the Parliament of Scotland as well as the Privy Council, a lawyer and a judge, who sided with the Parliamentarian cause during the Civil War.

== Early life ==
He was the son of Sir John Maitland, 1st Lord Thirlestane and Jean Fleming, only daughter and heiress of the Fourth Lord Fleming. He was admitted a member of the Privy Council of Scotland on 20 July 1615.

== Own Peerage ==
On 2 April 1616 he was created Viscount of Lauderdale, by Letters Patent, to him and his heirs male and successors in the lordship of Thirlestane.

He was subsequently made President of the Privy Council, and was appointed an Ordinary Lord of Session on 5 June 1618. He was at that time one of the Commissioners for the Plantation of Kirks.

On 14 March 1624, at Whitehall, London, he was created, by patent, Earl of Lauderdale, Viscount Maitland, and Lord Thirlestane and Boltoun.

== Later life ==
Lord Lauderdale was removed from his place on the bench, on 14 February 1626, in consequence of a resolution by King Charles I that no nobleman should hold the seat of an ordinary Lord, and instead was on 1 June following appointed one of the Extraordinary Lords of Session, usually reserved by the Crown for either noblemen or dignitaries of The Church. He remained an Extraordinary Lord until 8 November 1628, and in the following year was appointed one of the Lords of the Articles.

In 1639 he built Brunstane House (sometimes called Gilbertoun) east of Edinburgh as a new mansion house replacing the former mansion which had belonged to the Crichton family.

Regardless of the honours generously bestowed upon him by his monarch, upon the breaking out of the English Civil War, he joined the side of the parliament and was employed in a great variety of commissions of importance.

On 4 June 1644 he was elected President of the parliament, and reappointed on 7 January following. He died before the 20th of the same month, and was interred in the Maitland family burial vault within St. Mary's Collegiate Church, Haddington.

A poetical epitaph on him by Drummond of Hawthornden, as also the one by King James VI on his father, the Chancellor, can be found in George Crawfurd's Peerage.

== Marriage and issue ==
He married Lady Isabel Seton (d. November 1638), daughter of Alexander Seton, 1st Earl of Dunfermline, celebrated by Arthur Johnston in his poems. They had a large family of whom only three sons and one daughter survived their parents.

- John Maitland, 1st Duke of Lauderdale
- Robert Maitland (1623–1658).
- Charles Maitland, 3rd Earl of Lauderdale
- Jean Maitland (1612–1631)

== Offices and Titles ==
Peerage of Scotland
New creation	Earl of Lauderdale; 1624–1645	Succeeded by John Maitland
New creation	Viscount of Lauderdale; 1616–1645	Succeeded by John Maitland
Preceded by John Maitland	Lord Maitland of Thirlestane; 1595–1645	Succeeded by John Maitland
