= Elizabeth Maitland, Duchess of Lauderdale =

Scottish noblewoman (1626–1698)

Her Grace The Duchess of Lauderdale
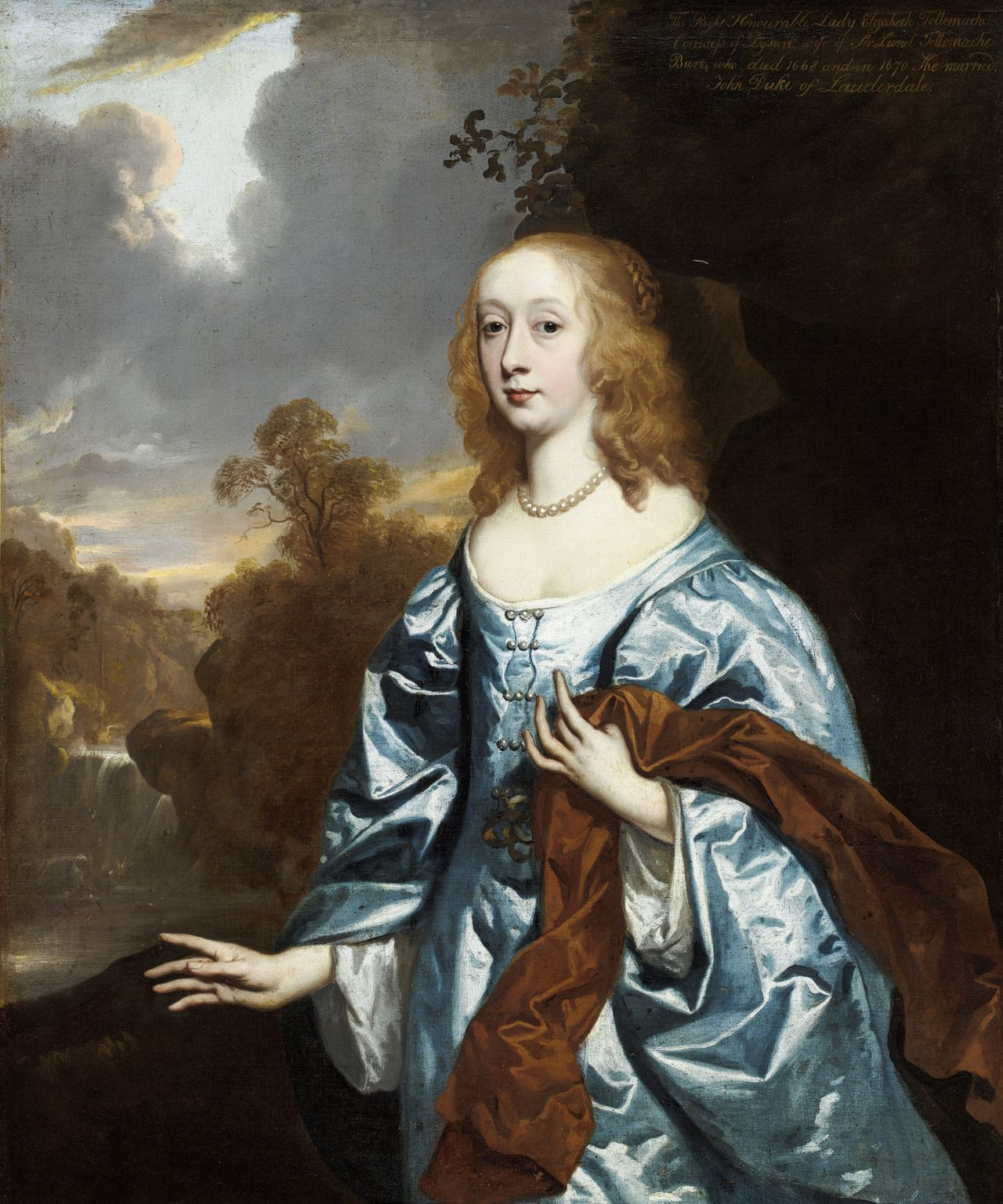
- 1648–49 portrait
- Born: 28 September 1626; London, England
- Died: 5 June 1698 (aged 71); Ham House, London
- Buried: St Peter's Church, Petersham
- Spouses: Sir Lionel Tollemache, 3rd Baronet (m. 1648; died 1669); John Maitland, 1st Duke of Lauderdale (m. 1672; died 1682)
- Issue: Lionel Tollemache, 3rd Earl of Dysart; Thomas Tollemache; Elizabeth Tollemache; William Tollemache; Catherine Tollemache
- Father: William Murray, 1st Earl of Dysart
- Mother: Catherine Bruce

Elizabeth Maitland, Duchess of Lauderdale (née Murray; 28 September 1626 – 5 June 1698) was a Scottish peeress. She was the eldest daughter of William Murray and his wife Catherine, the Earl and Countess of Dysart. She was raised in English court circles during the years leading up to the English Civil War and received a well-rounded education from her parents. Her first husband was Lionel Tollemache, with whom she had eleven children. In 1672, three years after Lionel's death, she married John Maitland, 1st Duke of Lauderdale and gained a prominent position in the restored court.

After her father's death, Maitland held the title of Countess of Dysart in her own right. After her remarriage in 1672, she was also the Duchess of Lauderdale. She was famous for the political influence she exercised and for her support for Charles II during his exile. As an associate of the secret Royalist organisation known as the Sealed Knot, she actively supported the return of the monarchy after the execution of Charles I. She was also a lifelong patron of artists, particularly Peter Lely. She died at the age of 71 at her family home, Ham House near Richmond by the Thames, and is buried in the nearby parish church.

== Early life ==
Murray was the eldest of the five daughters of William Murray, 1st Earl of Dysart, and his wife Catherine Bruce. Dysart was a close friend and groom of the bedchamber of Charles I. Murray's birth was recorded in the baptismal register at St. Martin-in-the-Fields in 1626. During that year, her parents moved to Ham House, near Richmond by the Thames, where she spent her childhood. Her father saw that she received a full education, which was unusual for women of the period, and her mother ensured she was prepared to run a household effectively.

== English Civil War and first marriage ==
During the English Civil War, Elizabeth's father was often away from the family in service to the King. Her mother took the opportunity to travel along the Thames to the court at Oxford, to spend time with William while also instructing her daughters in etiquette. Elizabeth developed a reputation for charisma and beauty, being described by Thomas Knyvett as "...a pretty witty Lass." After some years of searching for a suitable match, she married Sir Lionel Tollemache in 1648, a prudent choice for the daughter of a prominent Royalist given his apparent lack of political involvement, and one that created a stable marriage. The following year, Ham House was placed in the hands of trustees administered by Lionel, to help secure the estate from the threat of sequestration.

At the start of their marriage, Sir Lionel and Lady Dysart lived at Fakenham Magna in Suffolk, a wooded countryside near his family estate at Helmingham Hall and removed from much of the upheaval of war. They had eleven children, five of whom survived to adulthood:

- Lionel Tollemache, 3rd Earl of Dysart (1649–1727), the eldest son, inherited the Earldom of Dysart on his mother's death in 1698.
- Thomas Tollemache (1651–1694), lieutenant-general and MP.
- Elizabeth Tollemache (1659–1735) married Archibald Campbell, 1st Duke of Argyll.
- William Tollemache (1661–1694) was a captain in the Royal Navy.
- Catherine Tollemache (died 1705) married James Stewart, Lord Doune and secondly John Gordon, 16th Earl of Sutherland.

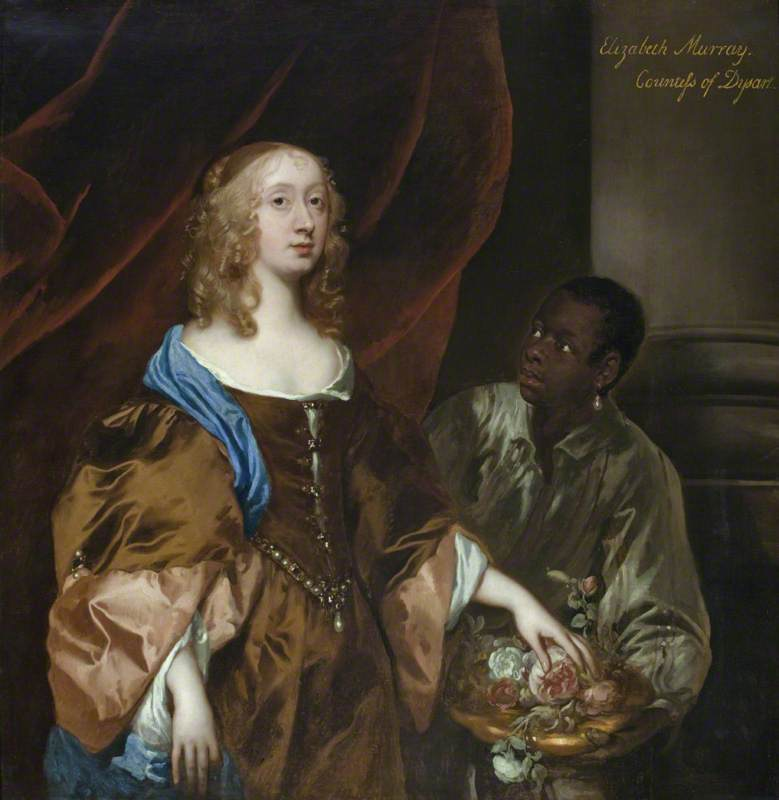
Lady Tollemache with a Black servant, c. 1651

Elizabeth often based herself at Ham House after her mother's death in 1649. She became acquainted with the Parliamentarian Oliver Cromwell, probably when his army headquarters were located in nearby Kingston-upon-Thames in the summer of 1647, and the connection provided a cover for her own Royalist tendencies. She also used that friendship to successfully plead for the life of John Maitland, the royalist Earl of Lauderdale, after his capture at the Battle of Worcester. (Note: Lauderdale acknowledged Elizabeth's intervention in his will dated 13 July 1670, bequeathing her "the summe of fifteen hundred pounds stirlin in gold...as a token of my gratitude for the paines and charges she was at in preserving my life when I was a prisoner in the year 1651..." In 1670, £1500 covered the annual wages of 59 skilled tradesmen.) From 1653, she was affiliated with the secret Royalist organisation, the Sealed Knot. She was in correspondence (Note: Her code name was "Mrs. Grey" and her letters were later intercepted and monitored by the Commonwealth's secret service.) with exiled supporters of Charles II and visited Europe often to convey letters to the King, despite being frequently pregnant and under the close scrutiny of the Protectorate. Her dedication to the cause led her to develop a type of invisible ink to be used for secret correspondence.

Upon her father's death in 1655, she inherited his titles, becoming Countess of Dysart and Lady Huntingtower in her own right. In September 1658 one of her neighbours, Judith Isham, joked about her new title, writing that people "call her my Lady Dessert, she is soe takeing, expressing extraordinary sivility to every person". A few years later, Elizabeth wrote to her kinsman Sir Robert Moray to help her trace her family lineage in order to complete the settlement of her family coat of arms. The result was a pedigree which allowed her to trace her ancestry back to King James II of Scotland.

In 1660, when Charles II was crowned, he rewarded Elizabeth with an annual pension of £800. (Note: In 1660, £800 was equivalent to 31 years' wages of a skilled tradesman.) She and her husband were also granted the freehold of 75 acres surrounding Ham House in recognition of "the service done by the late Earl of Dysart and his daughter". Her enemies accused her of witchcraft because of her political influence and she was subject to unfounded accusations of having had a liaison with Cromwell. Her title as Countess of Dysart was secured by the grant of new Letters Patent on 5 December 1670, which also reaffirmed the ability of female heirs to inherit the title where no male heir existed.

== Second marriage ==
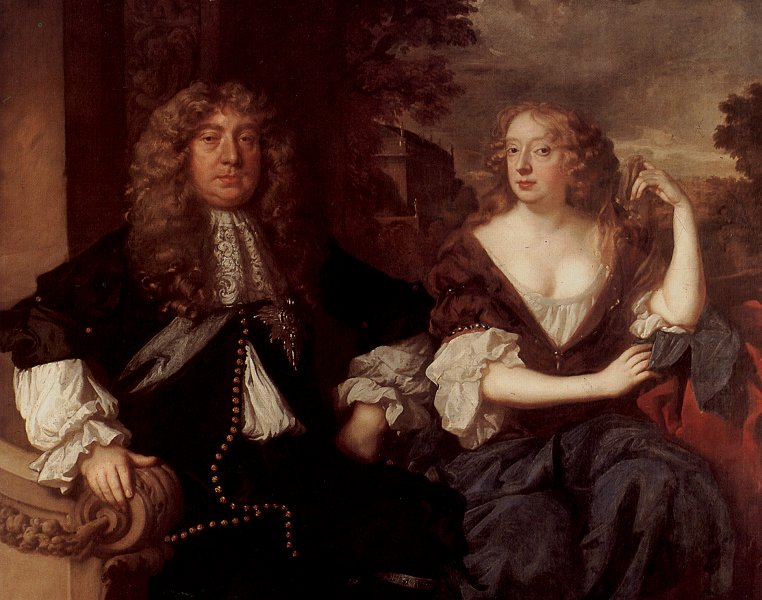
The Duke and Duchess of Lauderdale, by Peter Lely

In 1669, her husband Lionel died in France and Elizabeth became the sole owner of Ham House, along with other properties including Framsden Hall in Suffolk. Soon after Lionel's death she became the mistress of John Maitland, Earl of Lauderdale, the Scottish noble and politician, and became involved in the intrigues and power struggles of the Restoration court through her influence upon him, as well as other Scottish aristocrats such as William, Duke of Hamilton. Elizabeth and John married in February 1672, after the death of his estranged first wife Lady Anne Home in December 1671. He received a dukedom in May 1672, which then made Elizabeth the Duchess of Lauderdale. He was a member of the Cabal Ministry of Charles II and was appointed both Secretary of State and High Commissioner for Scotland. A month after their marriage, they travelled north to Scotland for the opening of the Scottish Parliament where, in defiance of tradition, Elizabeth decided to accompany her husband. Her insistence on chairs for herself and her ladies-in-waiting was the source of comment and condemnation. The pair became known for their influence, wealth and extravagance.

In January 1671, she wrote to her cousin, the Scottish architect William Bruce, seeking advice about a new gateway to the forecourt of Ham House in preparation for a planned visit by Charles II and his wife, Queen Catherine of Braganza. Bruce offered to send her a sketch for the piers that would be an improvement on a design supplied by her mason, John Lampen, with Scottish stone supplied by Robert Mylne. After some delay, the iron gates were made in England by Edward Harris and painted blue with smalt. She quarrelled with Bruce over further works, and in 1674 wrote to a mutual cousin the Earl of Kincardine, "the insolence of that creature is insufferable."

In 1673, she and her husband initiated a series of alterations to Ham House to enlarge and modernise the property according to the latest style. The infill of the southern face of the house enabled the creation of a set of royal chambers on the first floor as well as separate apartments for the Duke and Duchess on the ground floor. Shortly after the completion of the apartments, Elizabeth commissioned the creation of a bathroom in the basement of the home, an indication of her attention to hygiene. The efforts to modernise the house and furnish it with luxury furnishings and artwork were used as an expression of their power and affluence.

== Later life ==
In early 1680, Elizabeth suffered a severe attack of gout which affected her health for the rest of her life. In the same year, John's health also deteriorated after suffering a stroke as well as bouts of scurvy and bladder stones. He resigned his government positions in September, at which point Elizabeth nursed him at Ham House. Maitland's death in April 1682 precipitated legal action by her brother-in-law Lord Tweedale over his debts and funeral expenses. Tweedale had insisted on an ostentatious burial for his brother and subsequently sent the bill to Elizabeth, which triggered a dispute between them that persisted into the following decade. (Note: Shortly after his brother's death, Tweedale was convicted of debasing the coinage while serving as Master-General of the Scottish Mint and was subjected to a substantial fine.)

The Duke had mortgaged Ham House to fund the renovation of his Scottish properties (especially his favoured residence Thirlestane Castle), which had now been settled upon Lord Tweedale in the late Duke's will, while Ham House had been returned to Elizabeth. The Duchess sold some of her jewels as well as part of the late Duke's book collection to cover the interest on the mortgages. Despite the efforts of Lord Tweedale's son and even James II, the dispute persisted until being settled in the Scottish courts in June 1688, who required Lord Tweedale to cover the debts, while assigning Elizabeth the responsibility for the funeral expenses.

== Death and legacy ==
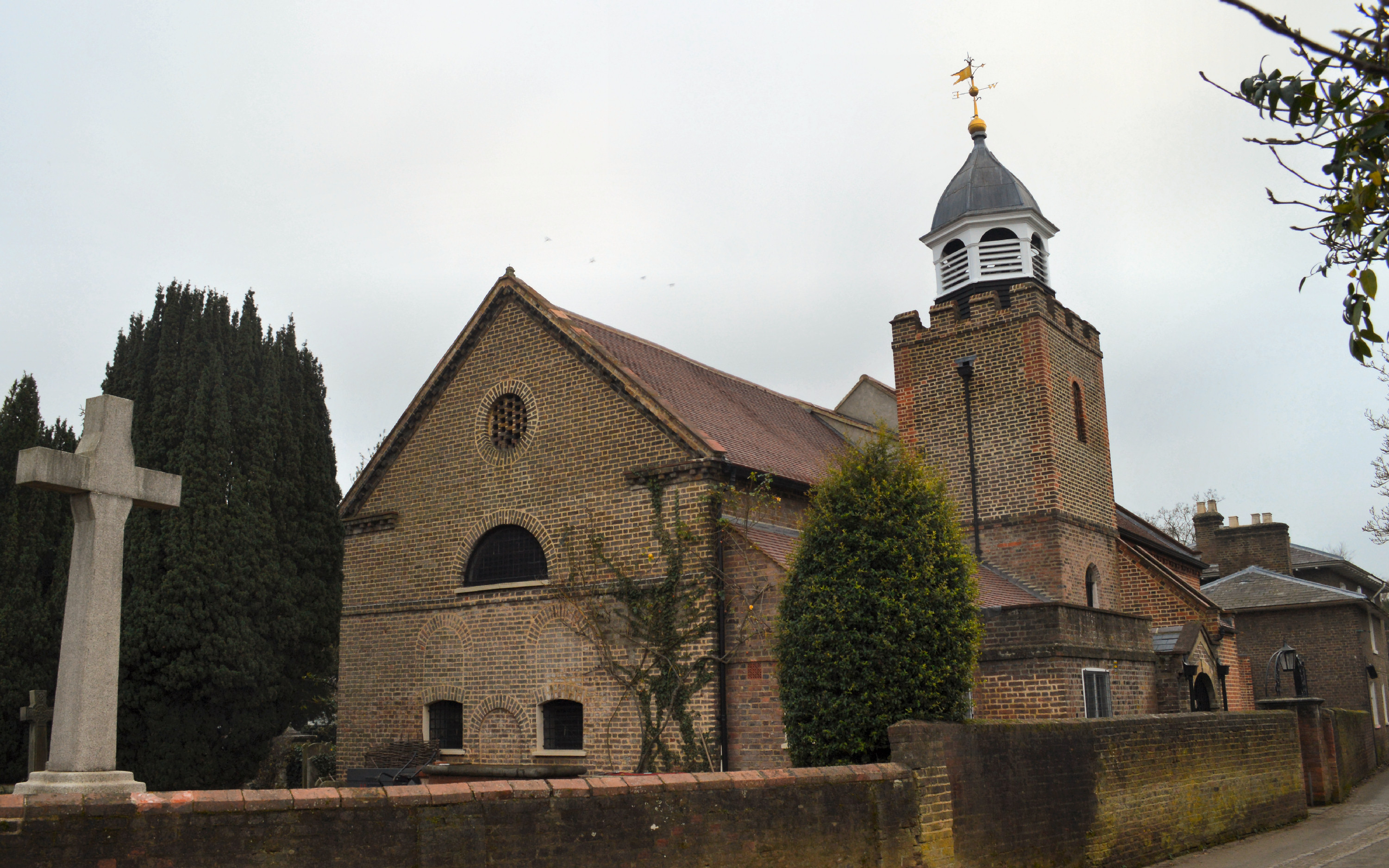
St. Peter's Church, Petersham, where Elizabeth Murray is buried

Elizabeth suffered from gout for many years, which limited her mobility until she was largely confined to the ground floor at Ham House. Despite that, she maintained a brisk correspondence with friends and family, as she was keenly interested in the news from Court. (Note: In late 1688, Elizabeth offered James II sanctuary at Ham House as he fled the advance of William of Orange – an offer declined on the grounds of lack of comfort.) In 1694, she suffered the loss of her sons Thomas and William.

The Duchess of Lauderdale died at the age of 71 on 5 June 1698 at Ham House. She is buried, according to her wishes, with other members of the Dysart family in a vault under the chancel of Petersham Parish Church.

Elizabeth Murray was first described in popular literature in the 1975 book by Doreen Cripps, Elizabeth of the Sealed Knot, which was based on research within the Tollemache family archives. Several portraits of Elizabeth were painted throughout her life by a range of artists including Peter Lely, John Weesop, Joan Carlile and Benedetto Gennari. Her patronage of Lely extended over decades, with four paintings of her, including the double portrait with John Maitland which remains on view at Ham House.

== Sources ==
- Akkerman, Nadine (2018). Invisible Agents: Women and Espionage in Seventeenth-Century Britain. Oxford: Oxford University Press. ISBN 978-0-198-82301-8. OCLC 1048595615.
- Cripps, Doreen (1975). Elizabeth of the Sealed Knot: a Biography of Elizabeth Murray, Countess of Dysart. Kineton, Warwickshire: Roundwood Press. ISBN 978-0-900-09343-2. OCLC 1937689.
- Dunn, John (1851). Letters Illustrative of Public Affairs in Scotland Addressed by Contemporary Statesmen to George, Earl of Aberdeen, Lord High Chancellor of Scotland, 1681–1684. Aberdeen: The Spalding Club. OCLC 758697755.
- Pritchard, Evelyn (2007). Ham House and its Owners through Five Centuries 1610–2006. London: Richmond Local History Society. ISBN 978-1-955-07172-7. OCLC 1118277705.
- Rowell, Christopher, ed. (2013). Ham House: 400 Years of Collecting and Patronage. Paul Mellon Centre for Studies in British Art. New Haven, CT / London: Yale University Press. ISBN 978-0-300-18540-9. OCLC 930829576.
- Schofield, Bertram (1949). The Knyvett Letters, 1620-1644. London: Norfolk Record Society. OCLC 1231461.
- Wilson, Michael I. (2018). Mistress of Ham : Elizabeth Maitland, Duchess of Lauderdale, 1626-1698. Harrow: Barbon Books. ISBN 978-0-9935429-1-6. OCLC 1055697313.

Peerage of Scotland
Preceded by William Murray	Countess of Dysart; 1655–1698	Succeeded by Lionel Tollemache
