= Rosamund Greaves, 11th Countess of Dysart =

Scottish peeress

The Right Honourable The Countess of Dysart
- Born: Rosamund Agnes Greaves; 15 February 1914; Great Britain
- Died: 17 December 2003 (aged 89); Inverness-shire, Scotland

Rosamund Greaves, 11th Countess of Dysart (15 February 1914 – 17 December 2003) was a Scottish peeress.

Rosamund was the eldest of three daughters of Wenefryde Agatha Greaves (1889–1975), 10th Countess of Dysart and Major Owain Edward Whitehead Greaves. On her mother's death in 1975 Lady Rosamund became the 11th Countess of Dysart.

Rosamund Greaves never married or had children; therefore, on her death in December 2003, her younger sister, Lady Katherine, succeeded to the titles of Countess of Dysart and Lady Huntingtower.

Peerage of Scotland
Preceded by Wenefryde Scott	Countess of Dysart; 1975–2003	Succeeded by Katherine Grant
