= John Weesop =

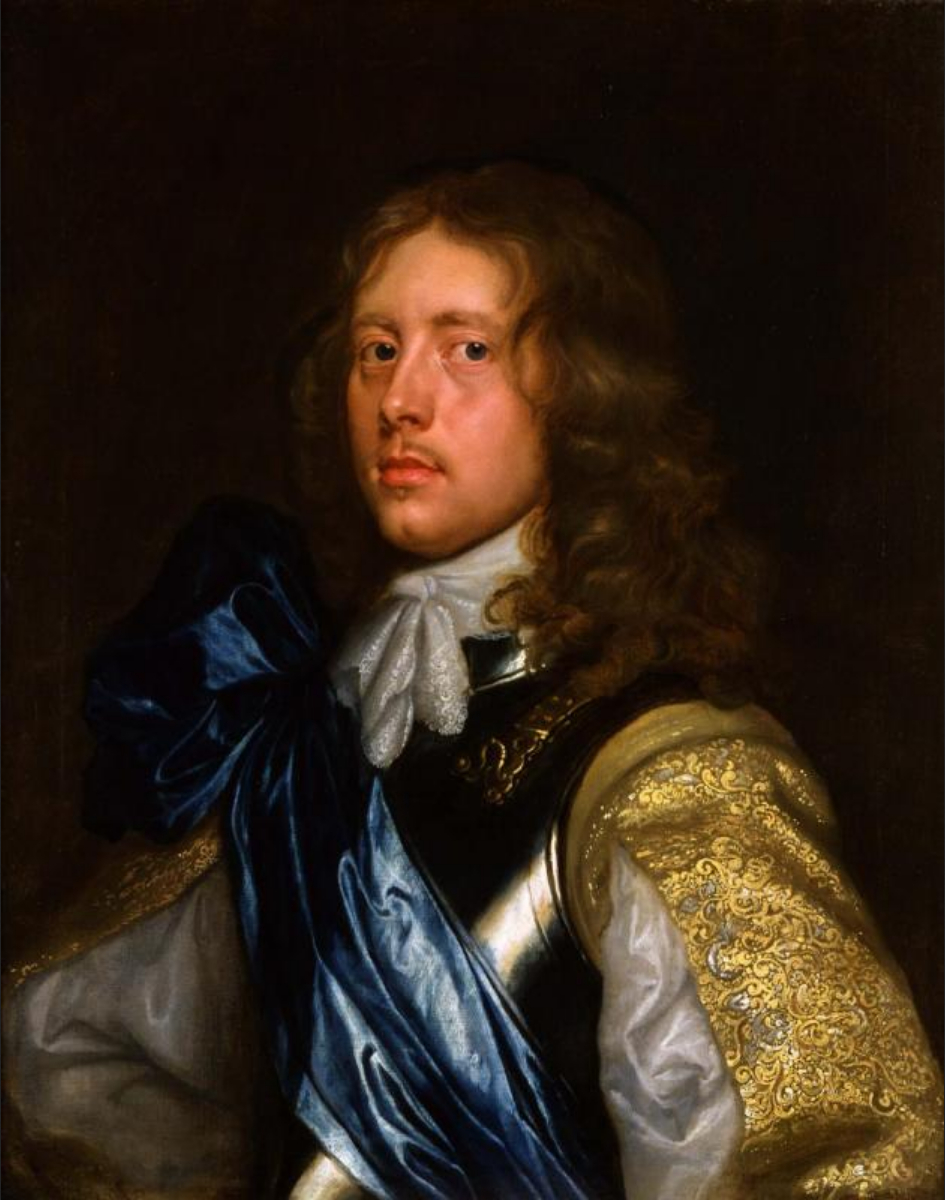
Portrait of Marmaduke D'Arcy

John Weesop or Jan Weesop (name variations: 'Wessopp', 'Wisop', 'Wesep' and 'Wesop') (fl 1640–1653) was a portrait painter presumed to be of Flemish descent who is now only known for his works produced in the 1640s in England. His English patrons were predominantly prominent members of the royalist aristocracy.

== Life ==
Very little is known about Weesop's life and career. Until recent research into the artist, the only information known about him were the remarks of the painter William Sykes, recorded by the English engraver and antiquary George Vertue who wrote that:

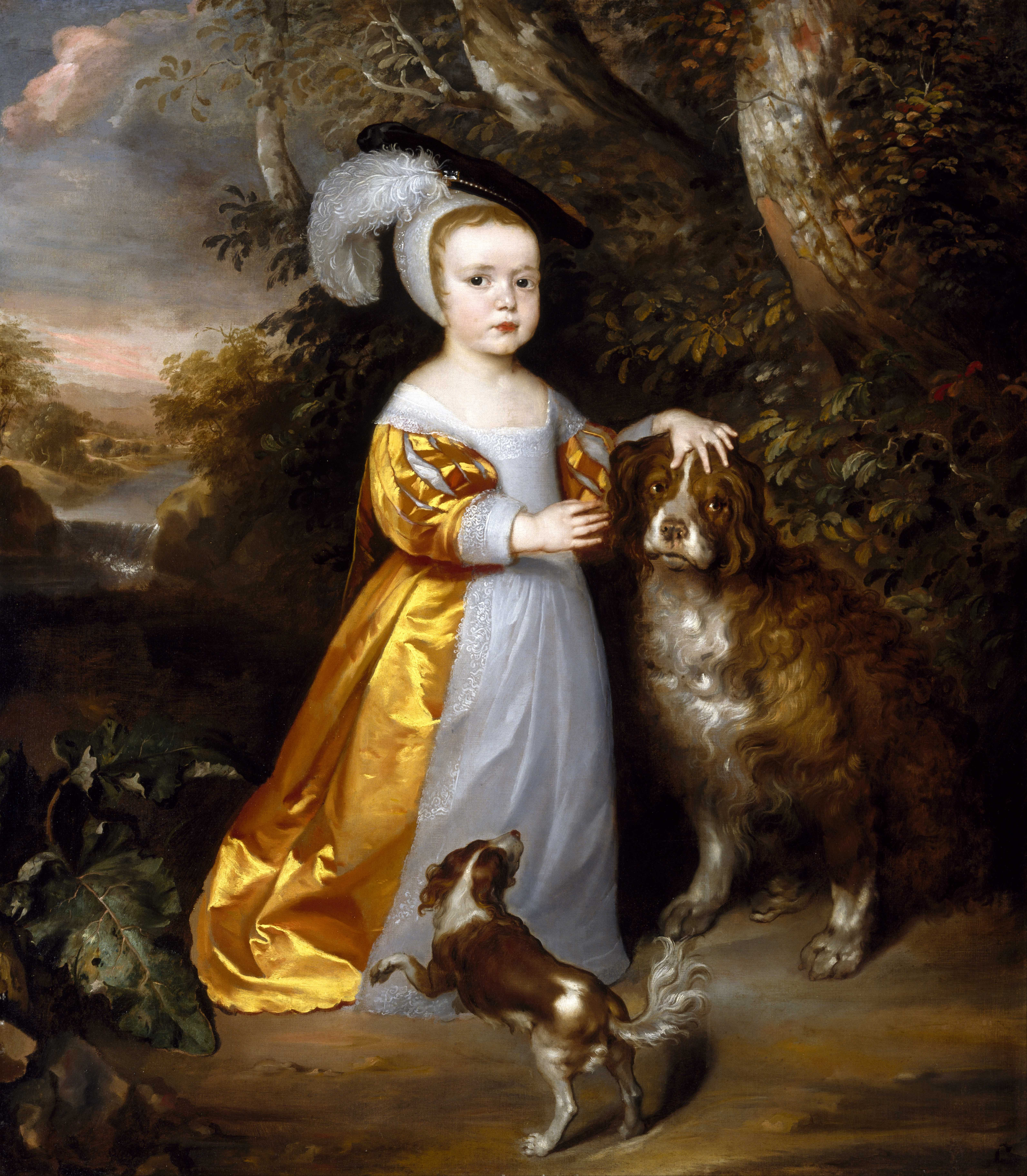
Esmé Stuart, 5th Duke of Lennox and 2nd Duke of Richmond

"Weesop arrived here in 1641, a little before the death of Vandyck, of whose manner he was a lucky imitator, and had the honour of having some of his pictures pass for that master's. He left England in 1649, saying 'he would never stay in a country where they cut of the King's head and were not ashamed of the action.' It had been more sensible to say, he would not stay where they cut of the head of a King that rewarded painters and defaced and sold his collection. One John Weesop, probably his son, was buried in St. Martin's in 1652."

George Vertue also recorded in a notebook that the painter William Sykes had informed him that a painter called 'Wesop' or 'Weesep' had come to England in 1641 'in the time of Vandyke' and had remained until 1649 and that his pictures 'pass for Vandyke' ('Vertue Note Books', I, Walpole Society, XVIII, 1929–30, p. 49).

Research by British art historian Sir Oliver Millar has provided a better understanding of the artist. Sir Oliver showed that John Weesop was still living, and presumably working, in London in 1653 and that a reference to a Mrs Weesop later in that year suggests that the painter likely died later that year.

From Vertue's remarks about Weesop and his patrons it has been concluded that he was sympathetic to the royalist cause. The portraits attributable to Weesop are all of patrons who were staunch royalists. These include figures such as Elizabeth Murray, Countess of Dysart and later Duchess of Lauderdale, Marmaduke D'Arcy and the members or allies of the Villiers family. In a 1730 list of three pictures a double portrait of 'Lord Grandison & Mr. Villiers' is given to Weesop. These brothers were the sons of Sir Edward Villiers, the half-brother of the Duke of Buckingham. Another painting recorded in 1730 was of Anne Villiers, Countess of Sussex, daughter of Buckingham's younger brother, the Earl of Anglesey.

== Work ==
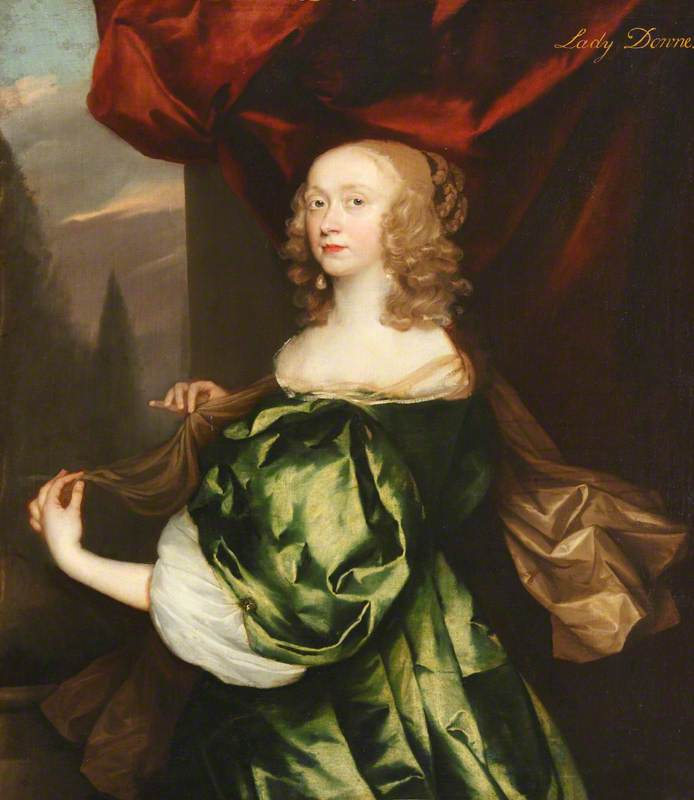
Portrait of Elizabeth Murray, Lady Tollemache

To date Weesop is only known as a portrait painter and for his work produced in England. Early inventory references attribute four pictures with relative reliability to Weesop. On the basis of these four works Sir Oliver Millar identified a small group of other portraits by the same artist which he believed to be 'palpably by one hand'. Virtue noted already the similarity of the Weesop portraits to those of van Dyck and even noted that 'many pictures painted by [Weesop] pass for Vandyke'. The latter statement is borne out by the fact that Weesop's Portrait of Esmé Stuart, Duke of Richmond and Duke of Lennox was catalogued as a van Dyck in the 18th century. Despite the similarities and the clear influence of van Dyck, Weesop's style kept its independence. He distinguishes himself in his palette and shows himself to be a gifted, even if sometimes idiosyncratic, colourist. In the Portrait of Esmé Stuart he shows his qualities as a colourist in the golden amber of the sitter's coat and the red evening light which suffuses the picture. In the composition he also displays a strong grasp of landscape painting in the contemporary Dutch tradition.

Sir Oliver Millar concluded that Weesop could for a brief period have presented something of a challenge to other portrait painters such as Peter Lely, John Hayls and Gerard Soest as is shown by his influential patronage.
