= William Murray, 1st Earl of Dysart =

Scottish peer and courtier (1600–1655)

The Right Honourable The Earl of Dysart
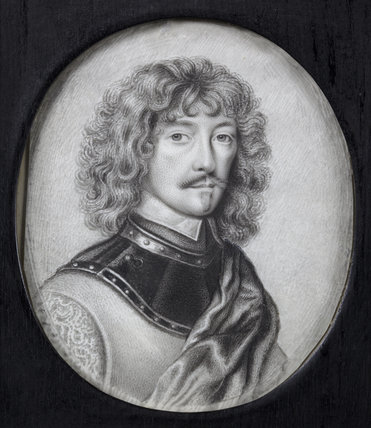
- Born: c. 1600; Dysart, Fife
- Died: December 1655 (aged 54–55); Edinburgh, Edinburghshire
- Spouse: Catherine Murray, Countess of Dysart
- Children: 4, including Elizabeth
- Parent(s): William Murray; Margaret Murray

William Murray, 1st Earl of Dysart (c. 1600 – December 1655) was a Scottish peer and courtier. During his childhood, he was educated with the future King Charles I. Later, he served as a Groom of the Bedchamber for Charles I of England before subsequently serving as an advisor to the King.

== Early life ==
Born c. 1600, Murray was son of William Murray (1561?–1616), minister of Dysart, Fife, by his wife Margaret. The father was a younger brother of Alexander Murray of Woodend, and was descended from a younger son of the family of Dollarie, which was a branch of the house of Tullibardine. William's uncle, Thomas Murray, took his nephew to court when a boy, and educated him along with Prince Charles. The latter and Murray were about the same age, and grew very close.

== Service to Charles ==
Murray was a Groom of the Bedchamber to Prince Charles. On 26 February 1626 he went to fight a duel with Humphrey Tufton. Instead, Murray fought with his own second, Gibson, a Scottish master gunner of the royal artillery and killed him.

In 1626, Charles, now king, appointed him a Groom of the Bedchamber, and retained him in his service ever afterwards. Charles granted Murray the lease of Ham House, close to the palace at Richmond, London and conveniently situated for access to the palaces in London, Hampton Court and Windsor and it was here that Murray established his family.

Murray had great influence with Charles, both as an adviser and in procuring favours for others. He was closely related to some of the leading covenanters — his uncle was the Rev. Robert Murray, minister of Methven from 1615 to 1648, whose daughter married George Gillespie — and Murray was a medium of private negotiations between them and the king. Montrose affirmed that Murray had sent to the Scots at Newcastle in October 1640 copies of private letters which he had written to the king, then at York. He accompanied Charles to Scotland in 1641, and having got access to Montrose (who was then a prisoner in Edinburgh Castle, by order of the covenanters) he carried communications from one to the other. After encouraging the impeachment of Hamilton and Argyll, it is said that Murray informed them of their danger, and hence their flight. At this time, Murray stood high in favour with the Scottish church, for soon after the king's return to England the commission of assembly besought Charles to "lay on him the agenting of the affairs of the church about his majesty." It was generally believed that Murray told his friend, Lord Digby, of the king's intention to arrest the five members of the House of Commons, and that Digby betrayed the secret.

=== Civil War ===
On the outbreak of the First English Civil War, Murray was sent by the king to Montrose to inform him and other friends in Scotland of the state of his affairs, and to procure their advice and help. In 1645, Murray was with Queen Henrietta Maria of France in Paris, and was employed by her in her negotiations on the king's behalf with foreign powers, and with the Pope. On his return to England in February 1646, he was seized as a spy in passing through Canterbury, and was sent as a prisoner to the Tower of London, where he remained till summer, when he was released through the influence of the Scots commissioners in London, who urged "that he had done good offices to many of the best ministers in Scotland."

He was allowed to go to the king, then at Newcastle, on the assurance of his countrymen that he would do all in his power to induce his master to yield to the conditions of the parliament. In September, Charles wrote to the queen, "William Murray is let loose upon me from London. ... As for religion, he and I are consulting for the best means how to accommodate it without going directly against my conscience. ... We are consulting to find such a present compliance as may stand with conscience and policy." In October, Murray was sent back to London on a secret mission, which he undertook at some risk of "putting his neck to a new hazard," but on his return he informed the king "that the Scots commissioners hindered him to do anything therein for the little hope he could give them of his ratifying the covenant." Soon after he and Sir Robert Murray made arrangements for the king's flight, but when the critical moment came Charles changed his mind. After the king was given up to the English, Murray was forbidden his presence, and returned to the continent.

== Later life ==
In 1648, Henrietta Maria sent him to Scotland to further 'the engagement', and to persuade his countrymen to receive the Prince of Wales, whom she wished to take part in the effort for the deliverance of the king. He first tried to induce Argyll and the dominant party in the church to support the resolutions of the Scottish estates, but, failing in this, he took counsel with the Duke of Hamilton and his friends, and in May, he returned to the continent with letters from them formally inviting the prince to Scotland.

Among those who gathered round Charles II at the Hague immediately after his father's death, Lord Byron mentions "old William Murray, employed here by Argyll." After the Scots commissioners returned unsatisfied in June 1649 from their visit to the Dutch Republic, Charles sent over William Murray with private letters to Argyll and Loudoun. It is to this period apparently that John Livingston refers in his 'Autobiography' when he says that William Murray and Sir Robert Moray, who had long been very intimate with Argyll, 'put him in hopes that the king might marry his daughter.'

In 1650, when the Scots commissioners were treating with Charles at Breda, Murray was sent with instructions to them, and in May of that year Sir William Fleming, who carried letters from Charles to Montrose, with whom he was still in correspondence, was directed to advise with William Murray and others as to whether Montrose should still keep the field or not. This goes to show that Murray abetted and shared in the king's duplicity. Burnet says that Murray was "very insinuating, but very false, and of so revengeful a temper that rather than any of the counsels given by his enemies should succeed he would have revealed them and betrayed both the king and them. It was generally believed that he had betrayed the most important of all his [the king's] secrets to his enemies. He had one particular quality, that when he was drunk, which was very often, he was upon a most exact reserve, though he was pretty open at all other times." The last statement does not seem very credible, but the attempt to please both his royal master and the extreme covenanters was not compatible with straightforwardness.

== Ennoblement ==
He received his earldom from Charles I at Oxford in 1643, or, as Burnet says, at Newcastle in 1646, when he persuaded the king to antedate it by three years. As the patent did not pass the great seal, he ranked as a commoner till 1651, when, according to Lament's 'Diary', several of the gentry were ennobled by Charles II, and among them 'William Murray of the bedchamber, who was made Lord Dysart.'

== Family ==
He married Catharine Bruce, granddaughter of Sir Robert Bruce of Clackmannan and Margaret Murray of the Tullibardine family, and had four daughters. The first, Elizabeth, born in 1626, inherited her father's title and later became Duchess of Lauderdale. Anne and Catherine never married, but Murray's youngest daughter, Margaret, married William Maynard, 2nd Baron Maynard.

== Death ==
Murray was thought by some to have died in exile in France, and an early biographer believed him to have died in 1651. However, it is known that he died in Edinburgh in December 1655 and his cousin, Thomas Murray, a Scottish lawyer, drew up reports for his daughters.

== Sources ==
- This article incorporates text from a publication now in the public domain: Sprott, George Washington (1894). "Murray, William (1600-1651)" . In Lee, Sidney (ed.). Dictionary of National Biography. Vol. 39. London: Smith, Elder & Co. pp. 407–408. Sprott attributes the following sources:
  - Douglas's Peerage
  - Complete Peerage, by G. E. C.
  - Clarendon's History
  - Gardiner's History of the Civil War
  - Balfour's Annals
  - Baillie's Letters
  - Burnet's History of his own Time, and Memoirs of the Dukes of Hamilton
  - Letters of Charles I in 1646 (Camden Society, 1855)
  - Disraeli's Charles I
  - Masson's Life of Milton
  - Napier's Life of Montrose.

Peerage of Scotland
New creation	Earl of Dysart; 1643–1655	Succeeded by Elizabeth Murray
