= Rothiemurchus Forest =

Forest and remnant of the Caledonian Forest in Highland (council area), Scotland

Coordinates: 57.1591°N 3.7872°W

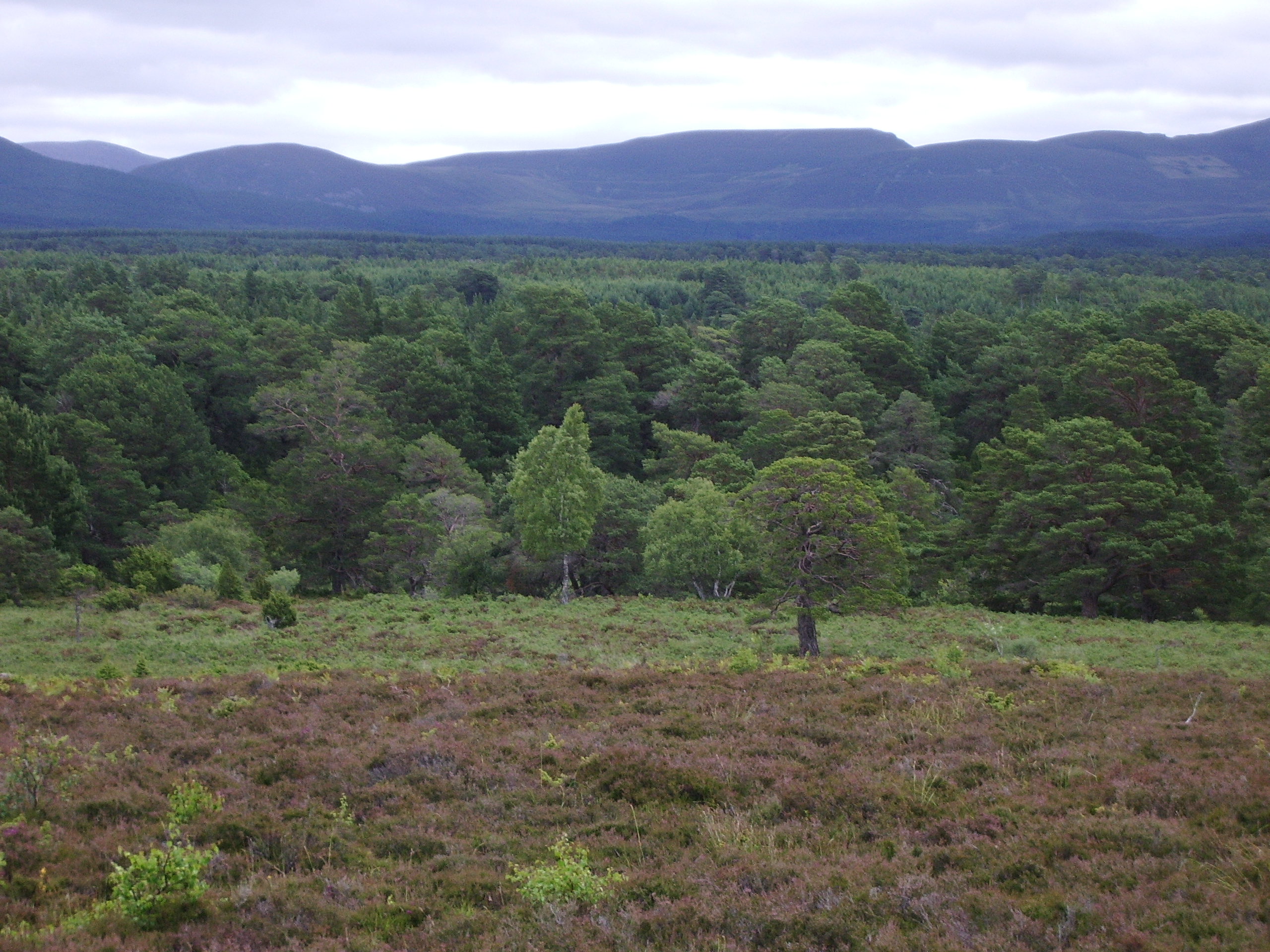
Rothiemurchus Forest

Rothiemurchus Forest is a remnant of the Caledonian Forest at grid reference NH9209 near Aviemore, Inverness-shire, Scotland. It is in the Highland region.

The forest is popular for recreation and contains important independent wildlife, including the osprey, Scottish crossbill, capercaillie, crested tit and European wildcat.

Stretching from the River Spey to the high mountain plateau, Rothiemurchus sits within the Cairngorms National Park.

== Ownership and management ==
Much of the forest is within the Rothiemurchus Estate, in the ownership of the Grant family since the 1540s. The estate is now owned and managed by Johnnie Grant, 13th Earl of Dysart and 17th Laird of Rothiemurchus, along with his family. The land was also managed by Philippa Grant, Countess of Dysart till September 2022, when she was killed in a road traffic collision. In 2014, Rothiemurchus Upper Forest – covering 2,300 hectares (5,700 acres) – was sold to Forestry Commission Scotland (now Forestry and Land Scotland) for £7.4 million.

== History ==
During the Napoleonic Wars, the high demand for timber led to substantial tree felling on the Rothiemuchus estate, the travel writer Sarah Murray estimating in 1803 that 'perhaps £1,500 worth of timber' was being cut down annually. Damage to salmon traps caused by logs being floated down the Spey led to tensions between Sir John Peter Grant and Alexander Gordon, 4th Duke of Gordon. By the 1820s, timber was generating an income of £4,000 to £5,000 per annum, though the upkeep of dams, locks, sluices, dykes, channels, and heavy horses to haul the logs to the river was costly. In 1839, John Grigor reported that the old pine forest of Rothiemurchus was 'much exhausted'. In 1853, twelve poor families from Rothiemurchus emigrated to Tasmania on the Sir Allan McNab. Rothiemurchus was converted into a deer forest in 1859.
