= John Maitland, 1st Duke of Lauderdale =

Scottish statesman (1616–1682)

His Grace The Duke of Lauderdale KG PC
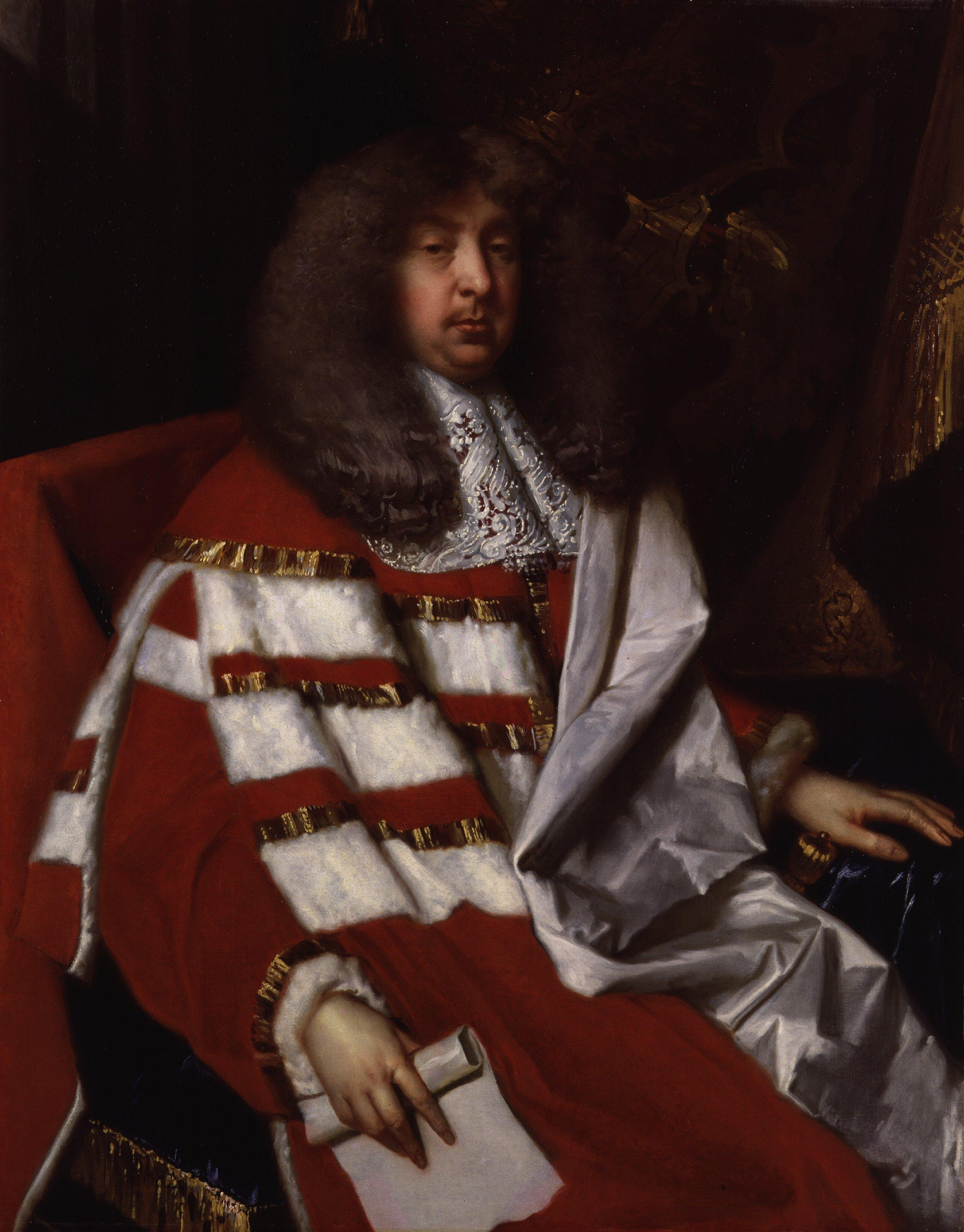
- Portrait by Jacob Huysmans, c. 1665

Lord High Commissioner
- In office 2 August 1669 – October 1680
- Monarch: Charles II
- Preceded by: Earl of Rothes
- Succeeded by: Duke of Albany

Secretary of State
- In office 19 January 1661 – October 1680
- Monarch: Charles II
- Preceded by: William Kerr, 1st Earl of Lothian
- Succeeded by: Earl of Middleton

Personal details
- Born: 24 May 1616 Lethington Castle, East Lothian, Scotland
- Died: 24 August 1682 (aged 66) Tunbridge Wells, Kent, England
- Resting place: St Mary's Collegiate Church
- Spouse(s): Lady Anne Home; Elizabeth, Countess of Dysart

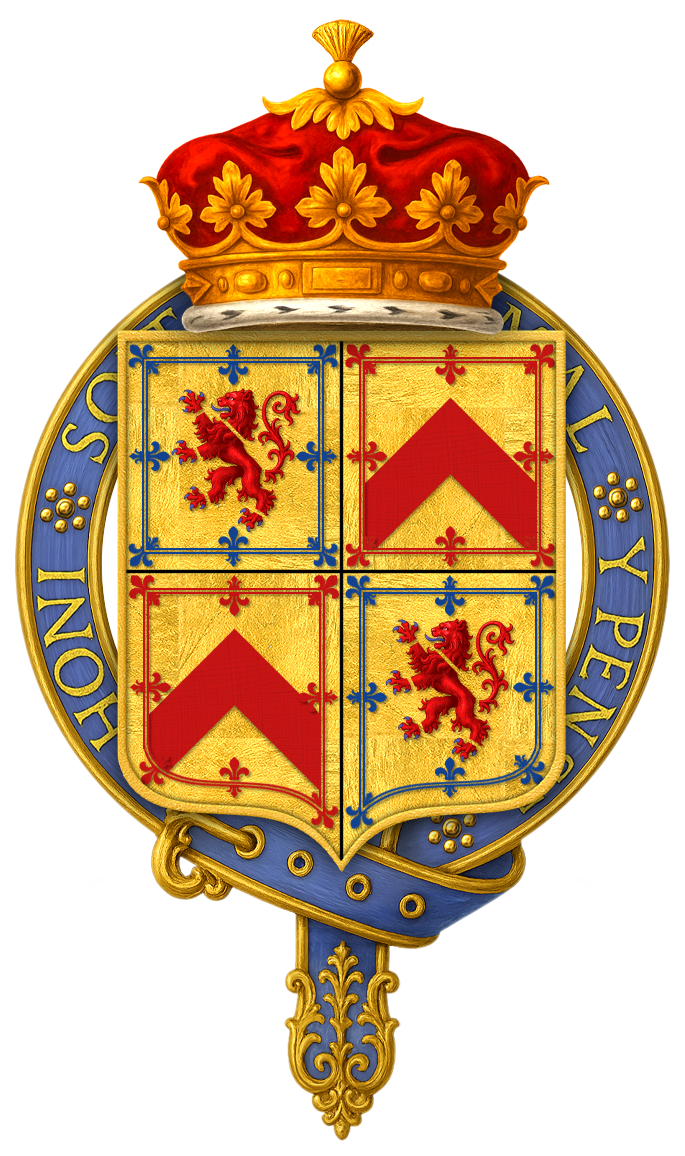
Quartered arms of John Maitland, 1st Duke of Lauderdale, KG

John Maitland, 1st Duke of Lauderdale (24 May 1616 – 24 August 1682) was a Scottish statesman.

== Background ==
Maitland was a member of an ancient family of both Berwickshire and East Lothian, the eldest surviving son of John Maitland, 2nd Lord Maitland of Thirlestane (d. 1645), (who had been created Viscount of Lauderdale in 1616, and Earl of Lauderdale etc., in 1624), and of Isabel Seton (1594–1638), daughter of Alexander Seton, 1st Earl of Dunfermline and great-grandson of Sir Richard Maitland of Lethington, the poet.

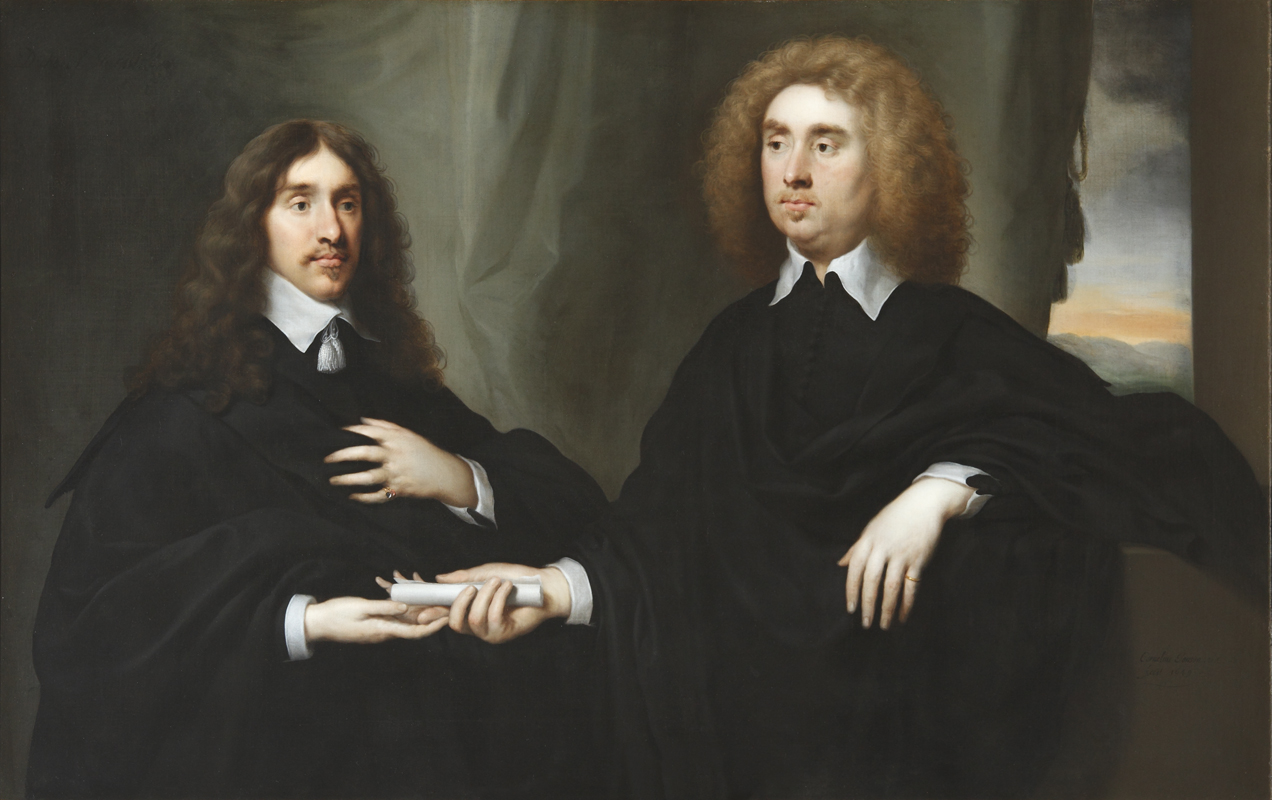
John Maitland (right) with William Hamilton, Duke of Hamilton (left) in 1649

== Covenanter ==
Maitland began public life as a zealous adherent of the Presbyterian cause, took the Covenant, sat as an elder in the General Assembly of the Church of Scotland at St Andrews in July 1643, and was sent to the Kingdom of England as a Commissioner for the Covenant in August, and to attend the Westminster Assembly in November.

== Privy Counsellor in two kingdoms ==
In February 1644 he was a member of the Privy Council of England and the Privy Council of Scotland, and on 20 November was one of the Commissioners appointed to meet the king at Uxbridge, when he made efforts to persuade King Charles I to agree to the establishment of Presbyterianism. In 1645 he advised Charles to reject the proposals of Independents, and in 1647 he was in London when the Scottish Estates in Edinburgh ordered the king's surrender to the Scots.

== Second English Civil War and the Worcester Campaign ==
Once Charles surrendered to the Scots, Lauderdale veered round completely to the king's cause, had several interviews with him, and engaged in various projects for his restoration, offering the aid of the Scots, on the condition of Charles's consent to the establishment of Presbyterianism, and on 26 December he obtained from Charles at Carisbrooke Castle "The Engagement" by which Presbyterianism was to be established for three years, schismatics were to be suppressed, and the acts of the Parliament of Scotland ratified, the king in addition promising to admit the Scottish nobles into public employment in England and to reside frequently in Scotland.

Returning to Scotland, in the spring of 1648, Lauderdale joined the party of Hamilton in alliance with the English royalists. Their defeat at the Battle of Preston, postponed the arrival of the Charles, Prince of Wales, but Lauderdale had an interview with the prince in the Downs in August, and from this period obtained supreme influence over the future king. He persuaded Prince Charles later to accept the invitation to Scotland from Archibald Campbell, Marquess of Argyll's faction, accompanied him thither in 1650 and in the expedition into England, and was captured following the Battle of Worcester in 1651. He escaped from the city in the company of the Earl of Derby and Duke of Buckingham, but they were taken prisoner near Newport in Shropshire.

== Interregnum ==
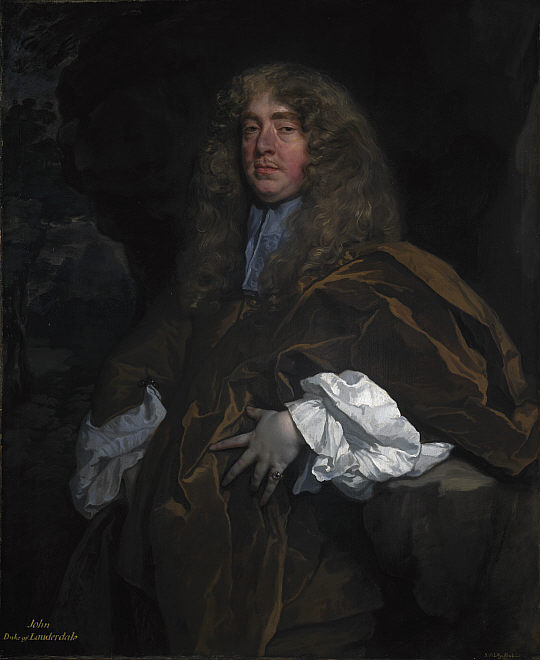
John Maitland, 1st Duke of Lauderdale, painted around 1665 by Sir Peter Lely.

Lauderdale remained in confinement from his capture at Worcester until March 1660. He was exempted from Cromwell's Act of Grace under which his estates were confiscated by Oliver Cromwell the Lord Protector. This was fortunate for him, because confiscated estates were restored to their owners, while land sales to pay fines were not reversed at the Restoration.

== Restoration ==
Just before the restoration, he joined Charles II in May 1660 at Breda, the Netherlands, and in spite of the opposition of Edward Hyde, 1st Earl of Clarendon and George Monck, was appointed Secretary of State for Scotland. In January 1661, he was appointed to the King's new Privy Council.

From this time onwards he kept his hold upon the king, was lodged at Whitehall, was "never from the king's ear nor council", and maintained his position against his numerous adversaries by a crafty dexterity in dealing with men, a fearless unscrupulousness, and a robust strength of will, which overcame all opposition. Though a man of considerable learning and intellectual attainment, he was authoritarian and determined to implement the King's instructions.

He abandoned Argyll to his fate, permitted, if he did not assist in, the restoration of episcopacy in Scotland, and after triumphing over all his opponents in Scotland drew into his own hands the whole administration of that kingdom, and proceeded to impose upon it the absolute supremacy of the crown in Kirk and state, restoring the nomination of the lords of the articles to the king and initiating severe measures against the Covenanters. In 1669 he was able to boast with truth that "the king is now master here in all causes and over all persons".

== The Cabal Ministry ==
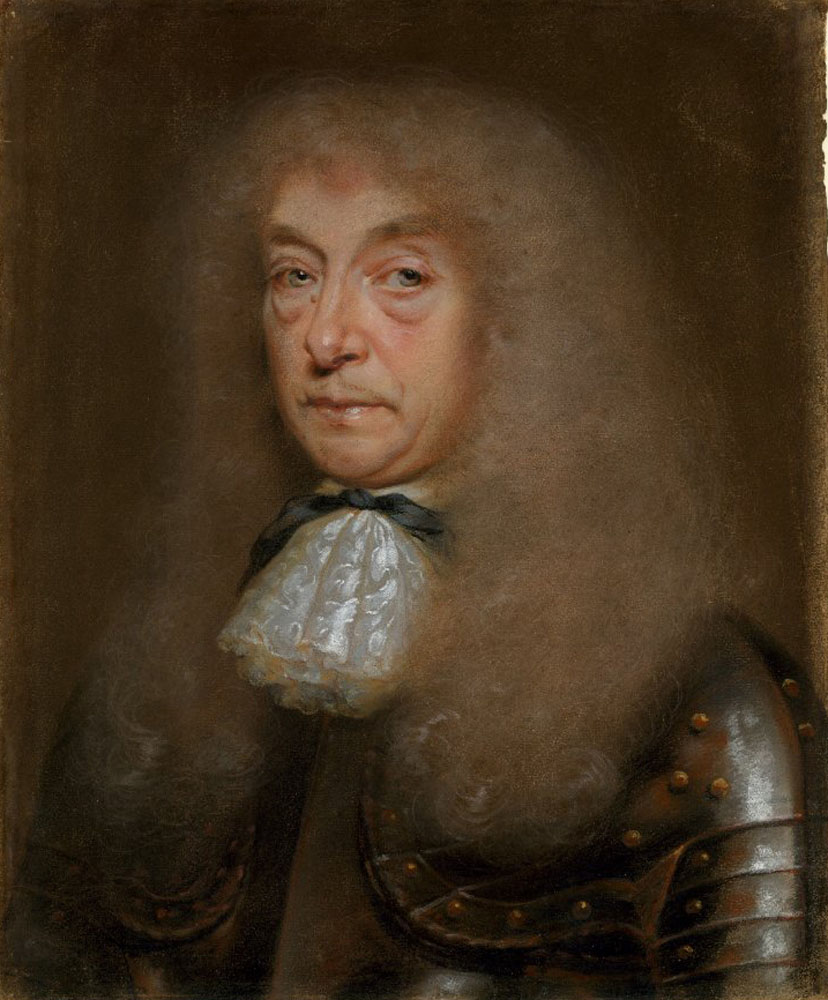
John Maitland was created Duke of Lauderdale and Earl of March on 2 May 1672.

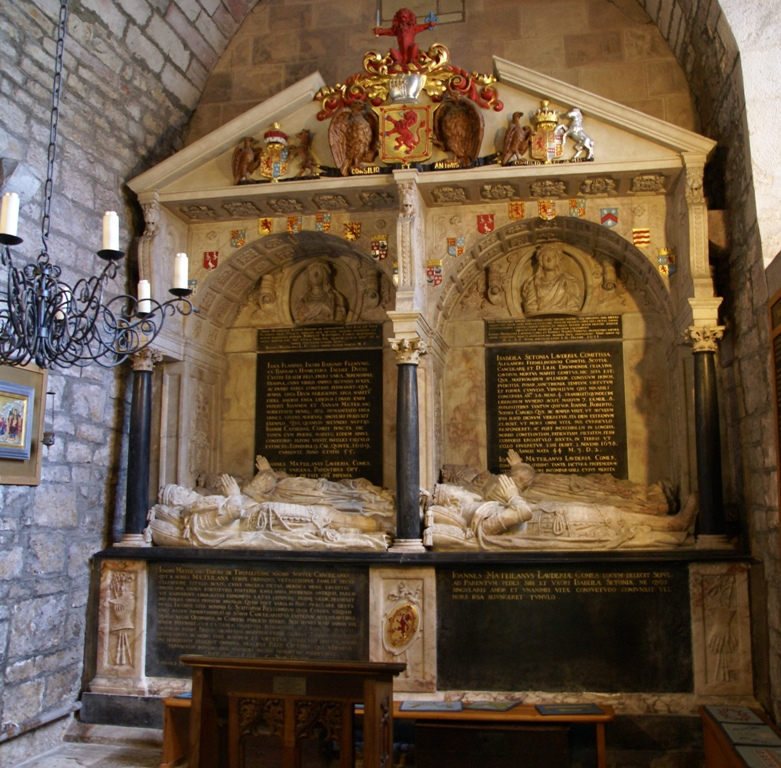
The Maitland tomb, St Mary's Church, Haddington

His own power was now at its height, and his position as the favourite of Charles II, controlled by no considerations of patriotism or statesmanship, and completely independent of the English parliament, recalled the worst scandals and abuses of the Stuart administration before the English Civil War.

He was a member of the Cabal Ministry, but took little part in English affairs, and being a Presbyterian was not entrusted with the first secret Treaty of Dover, but gave personal support to Charles in his degrading demands for pensions from Louis XIV. On 2 May 1672 he was created Duke of Lauderdale and Earl of March, and on 3 June Knight of the Garter.

In 1673, on the resignation of James, Duke of York in consequence of the Test Act, he was appointed a Lord Commissioner of the Admiralty. In October he visited Scotland to suppress the dissenters and obtain money for the Third Anglo-Dutch War. The intrigues organised by Anthony Ashley-Cooper, 1st Earl of Shaftesbury, against his power in his absence, and the attacks made upon him in the House of Commons in January 1674 and April 1675, were alike rendered futile by the steady support of Charles and James.

On 25 June 1674 he was created Earl of Guilford and Baron Petersham in the Peerage of England. His ferocious measures having failed to suppress the conventicles in Scotland, he summoned to his aid in 1677 a band of Highlanders, who were sent into the western country. In consequence, a large party of Scottish nobles went to London, made common cause with the English Country Faction, and compelled Charles to order the disbandment of the marauders. In May 1678 another demand made in the Commons for Lauderdale's removal was defeated due to court influence, by a margin of only a single vote.

He maintained his triumphs almost to the end. In Scotland, which he visited immediately after this victory in the Parliament of England, he overbore all opposition to the king's demands for money. Another address for his removal from the Commons in England was suppressed by the dissolution of parliament on 26 May 1679, and a renewed attack upon him, by the Scottish party and Shaftesbury's faction combined, also failed. Later that summer on 22 June 1679 the last attempt of the Covenanters was suppressed at the Battle of Bothwell Brig.

== Resignation ==
Following a stroke and the onset of scurvy in 1680, his health and abilities failed leading Lauderdale to resign in October that year the place and power for which he had so long successfully struggled. His vote given for the execution of Lord Stafford on 29 November incurred the displeasure of the Duke of York.

== Personal life ==
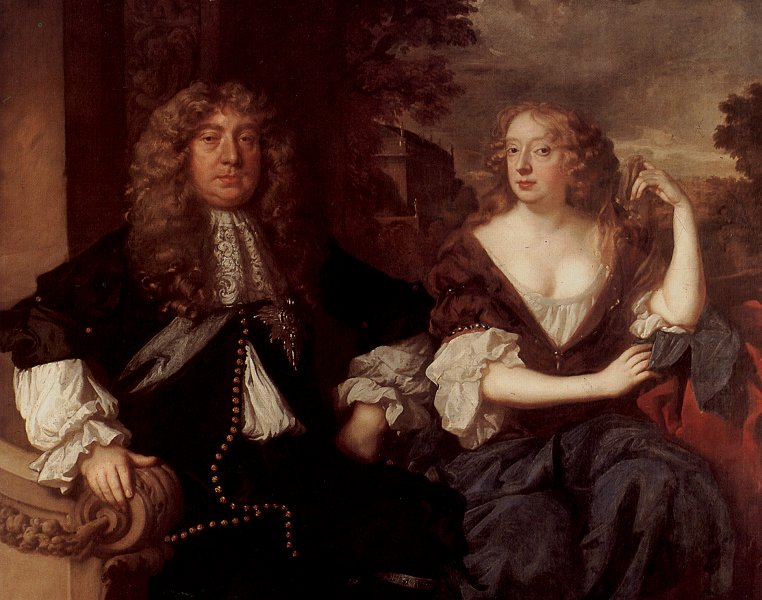
John Maitland (left) married Elizabeth Murray (right) in 1672 upon the death of his first wife, Anne Home.

Lauderdale's first marriage was to Lady Anne Home, daughter of Alexander Home, 1st Earl of Home and Mary (Dudley) Sutton, by whom he had one daughter, Mary, who married John Hay, 2nd Marquess of Tweeddale.

In 1672, after his wife's death in Paris he married Elizabeth, Countess of Dysart in her own right, daughter of William Murray, 1st Earl of Dysart, and now widow of Sir Lionel Tollemache. Among his stepchildren was General Thomas Tollemache. He left no male heir, consequently his dukedom and his English titles became extinct, but he was succeeded in the earldom by his brother Charles Maitland, 3rd Earl of Lauderdale.

== See also ==
- William Maitland of Lethington

== Sources ==
- Airy, Osmund (1885–1900). "Maitland, John (1616-1682)" . Dictionary of National Biography. London: Smith, Elder & Co.
- Marshall, Rosalind K. (2004). "Murray, Elizabeth, duchess of Lauderdale and suo jure countess of Dysart (bap. 1626, d. 1698)". Oxford Dictionary of National Biography. Oxford University Press. doi:10.1093/ref:odnb/19601.
- Maitland, John (1884). Airy, Osmund (ed.). The Lauderdale Papers (1639-1667). Vol. 1. London: Camden Society.
- Maitland, John (1885a). Airy, Osmund (ed.). The Lauderdale Papers (1667-1678). Vol. 2. London: Camden Society.
- Maitland, John (1885b). Airy, Osmund (ed.). The Lauderdale Papers (1673-1679). Vol. 3. London: Camden Society.

Attribution

Political offices
Preceded by The Earl of Lothian	Secretary of State; 1660–1679	Succeeded by The Earl of Moray
Preceded by The Earl of Rothes	Lord High Commissioner to the Parliament of Scotland; 1669–1674	Succeeded by The Duke of York and Albany
Preceded by The Earl of Tweeddale	Lord President of the Council of Scotland; 1672–1681	Succeeded by Sir George Gordon, Bart.
Peerage of Scotland
New creation	Duke of Lauderdale; 1672–1682	Extinct
Preceded by John Maitland	Earl of Lauderdale; 1645–1682	Succeeded by Charles Maitland
Peerage of England
New creation	Earl of Guilford; 1674–1682	Extinct
