= Sarah Murray (travel writer) =

English travel writer

Sarah Murray, née Maze (1744 – 5 November 1811) was an English travel writer, best known for her Companion and Useful Guide to the Beauties of Scotland (1799). She published under the name The Hon. Mrs. Murray, of Kensington, though after her second marriage she was also known as Sarah Aust.

== Life ==
Sarah Maze was born in 1744, and baptised in Batheaston. During the 1760s she seems to have run a school in Bath, but by 1782 she had moved to Kensington. In 1783 she married her first husband, the Hon. William Murray, brother of the Earl of Dunmore, though he died in 1786. In 1802 she married George Aust (1740-1829), a retired Under-Secretary of State for Foreign Affairs.

Murray published her Companion and Useful Guide to the Beauties of Scotland in 1799. The book was written in a lively style, giving a graphic picture of the modes of travel of the time, and describing the living conditions of Scottish peasants. Following further trips to Scotland, she published a second volume: A Companion and Useful Guide to the Beauties in the Western Highlands of Scotland, and in the Hebrides in 1803. This second volume paid greater attention to the Hebrides and the islands round Scotland. A second edition of both volumes was published in 1805, and a third edition in 1810. The third edition contained an appendix dealing with "the new roads in Scotland, and [...] a beautiful cavern lately discovered in the Isle of Skye."

She died at the age of 67, at Noel House, Kensington, on 5 November 1811.

== Works ==
- (as Sarah Maese) The School: Being a Series of Letters, Between a Young Lady and Her Mother, 1766
- (as The Hon. Mrs. Murray, of Kensington) A Companion and Useful Guide to the Beauties of Scotland, to the Lakes of Westmoreland, Cumberland, and Lancashire, and to the Curiosities in the District of Craven, in the West Riding of Yorkshire; to which is added a more particular Description of Scotland, especially that part of it called the Highlands, 1799
- A Companion and Useful Guide to the Beauties in the Western Highlands of Scotland, and in the Hebrides; to which is added, a Description of Part of the Main Land, of Scotland, and of the Isles of Mull, Ulva, Staffa, I-Columbkil, Tirii, Coll, Eigg, Skye, Raza, and Scalpa, 1803
