= Tollemache baronets of Helmingham (1611) =

Escutcheon of the Tollemache baronets of Helmingham

The Tollemache baronetcy, or Talmash, of Helmingham in the County of Suffolk, was created in the Baronetage of England on 22 May 1611 for Lionel Tollemache, High Sheriff of Suffolk in 1609 and 1617.

The 2nd Baronet represented Orford in the House of Commons, from 1621 to 1624, and from 1628 to the personal rule of Charles I. The 3rd Baronet married Elizabeth Murray, 2nd Countess of Dysart, and their son Lionel succeeded to both the baronetcy and earldom.

The baronetcy remained united to the earldom until the death of the 7th Baronet, a younger son of the 4th Baronet, in 1821. The baronetcy then became extinct. As of 2026 the earldom of Dysart is extant.

== Tollemache baronets, of Helmingham (1611) ==
- Sir Lionel Tollemache, 1st Baronet (1562–c. 1620)
- Sir Lionel Tollemache, 2nd Baronet (1591–1640)
- Sir Lionel Tollemache, 3rd Baronet (1624–1669)
- Lionel Tollemache, 3rd Earl of Dysart, 4th Baronet (1649–1727). He took the courtesy title Lord Huntingtower c.1654, and sat in Parliament, elected for Orford in 1679 and 1685, and for Suffolk as a Tory four times from 1701 to 1707.
- Lionel Tollemache, 4th Earl of Dysart, 5th Baronet (1708–1770)
- Lionel Tollemache, 5th Earl of Dysart, 6th Baronet (1734–1799)
- Wilbraham Tollemache, 6th Earl of Dysart, 7th Baronet (1739–1821)

== Notes ==
Baronetage of England
Preceded by Peyton baronets	Tollemache baronets 22 May 1611	Succeeded by Clifton baronets

|
