= Lionel Tollemache =

Lionel Tollemache may refer to:

- Lionel Tollemache, 3rd Earl of Dysart (1649–1727)
- Lionel Tollemache, 4th Earl of Dysart (1708–1770)
- Lionel Tollemache, 5th Earl of Dysart (1734–1799)
- Lionel Tollemache, 8th Earl of Dysart (1794–1878)
- Sir Lionel Tollemache, 1st Baronet (1562–1612)
- Sir Lionel Tollemache, 2nd Baronet (1591–1640)
- Sir Lionel Tollemache, 3rd Baronet (1624–1669)

== See also ==
- Sir Lyonel Tollemache, 4th Baronet (1854–1952)
