= Mary Paulet =

English noblewoman

Lady Mary Paulet
- Born: c. 1540
- Died: 10 October 1592 (aged 51–52)
- Buried: Launde Abbey, Leicestershire; 52.6313°N 0.82312°W
- Noble family: Paulet
- Spouse: Henry Cromwell, 2nd Baron Cromwell
- Issue: Edward Cromwell, 3rd Baron Cromwell; Sir Gregory Cromwell; Katherine Cromwell
- Father: John Paulet, 2nd Marquess of Winchester
- Mother: Elizabeth Willoughby

Mary Paulet, Lady Cromwell (c. 1540 – 10 October 1592) was an English noblewoman, the daughter of John Paulet, 2nd Marquess of Winchester of Basing, Hampshire and his first wife Elizabeth, daughter of Robert Willoughby, 2nd Baron Willoughby de Broke by his second wife, Dorothy, daughter of Thomas Grey, 1st Marquess of Dorset.

== Marriages and issue ==
Mary Paulet married, before 1560, Henry Cromwell, 2nd Baron Cromwell, (1538 – 20 November 1592), the son of her father's second wife, Elizabeth Seymour, and her second husband, Gregory Cromwell, 1st Baron Cromwell, and had issue:

- Edward Cromwell, 3rd Baron Cromwell, (c. 1560 – 27 April 1607), married firstly, Elizabeth Upton (died 1592/3), of Puslinch, Devon and secondly, Frances Rugge, (died 1631) of Felmingham, Norfolk, by whom he had a son, Thomas Cromwell, 1st Earl of Ardglass and two daughters, Frances and Anne. He served with the Earl of Essex in the expedition against Spain and was knighted by him in Dublin 12 July 1599.
- Sir Gregory Cromwell, married Frances, daughter of Edward Griffin of Dingley, Northamptonshire. Knighted by James I in 1603.
- Katharine Cromwell (d. 24 March 1621), married on 10 February 1581 at North Elmham, Norfolk, Sir Lionel Tollemache, 1st Baronet (1562 - 1612), of Helmingham, Suffolk, son of Sir Lionel Tollemache and Susan Jermyn. They had a son, Sir Lionel Tollemache, 2nd Baronet.

== Death ==
Mary died at North Elmham, Norfolk, 10 October 1592, and was buried, on 23 October, at Launde Abbey, Leicestershire. Henry Cromwell died soon after his wife, on 20 November at North Elmham, Norfolk, 1592 and was buried, on 4 December, at Launde Abbey.

== Bibliography ==
- Bindoff, S. T. (1982). "Cromwell, Thomas (by 1485-1540), of London". In Bindoff, S. T. (ed.). Members. The History of Parliament: the House of Commons 1509-1558. History of Parliament Online. Archived from the original on 7 May 2014.
- Burke, John (1831). A General and Heraldic Dictionary of The Peerages of England, Ireland and Scotland, Extinct, Dormant, and in Abeyance. London: Henry Colburn and Richard Bentley.
- "Calendar of the patent rolls preserved in the Public Record Office: Elizabeth [I] London: H.M.S.O., 1939-". Hathitrust.
- Carthew, G. A. (1878). The Hundred of Launditch and Deanery of Brisley; in the County of Norfolk; Evidences and Topographical Notes from public records, Heralds' Visitations, Wills, Court Rolls, Old Charters, Parish Registers, Town books, and Other Private Sources; Digested and Arranged as Materials for Parochial, Manorial, and Family History. Vol. II. Collected by G.A. Carthew. Norwich: Printed by Miller and Leavins. at HathiTrust
- Cokayne, G. E. (1900). Complete Baronetage. Vol. I. Exeter: William Pollard & Co.
- Cokayne, G. E. (1913). Gibbs, Vicary (ed.). The Complete Peerage of England, Scotland, Ireland, Great Britain and the United Kingdom. Vol. III. London: St. Catherine Press.
- Hawkyard, A. D. K. (1982). "Cromwell, Gregory (by 1516-51), of Lewes, Suss.; Leeds Castle, Kent and Launde, Leics.". In Bindoff, S. T. (ed.). Members. The History of Parliament: the House of Commons 1509-1558. Historyofparliamentonline.org.
- Lee, Sidney (1888). "Cromwell, Edward". In Stephen, Leslie (ed.). Dictionary of National Biography. Vol. 13. London: Smith, Elder & Co. pp. 151–152.
- Metcalfe, Walter C. (1885). A Book of Knights Banneret, Knights of the Bath, and Knights Bachelor. London: Mitchell and Hughes.
- Noble, Mark (1784). Memoirs of Several Persons and Families Who, by Females are Allied to, or Descended from the Protectorate-House of Cromwell. Birmingham: Pearson and Rollason. p. 8.
- Richardson, Douglas (2011). Everingham, Kimball G. (ed.). Plantagenet Ancestry: A Study in Colonial and Medieval Families. Vol. I (2nd ed.). CreateSpace. ISBN 978-1461045137.
- Richardson, Douglas (2011). Everingham, Kimball G. (ed.). Magna Carta Ancestry: A Study in Colonial and Medieval Families. Vol. III (2nd ed.). CreateSpace. ISBN 978-1461045205.
- Shaw, William A. (1906). The Knights of England. Vol. II. London: Sherrat and Hughes.
- Venn, John (1922). Alumni Cantabrigienses. Cambridge: Cambridge University Press.
- Wood, Mary Anne Everett (1846). Letters of Royal and Illustrious Ladies. Vol. II. London: Henry Colburn.
