= Catherine Tollemache =

English aristocrat and writer of recipes

- Lady Tollemache
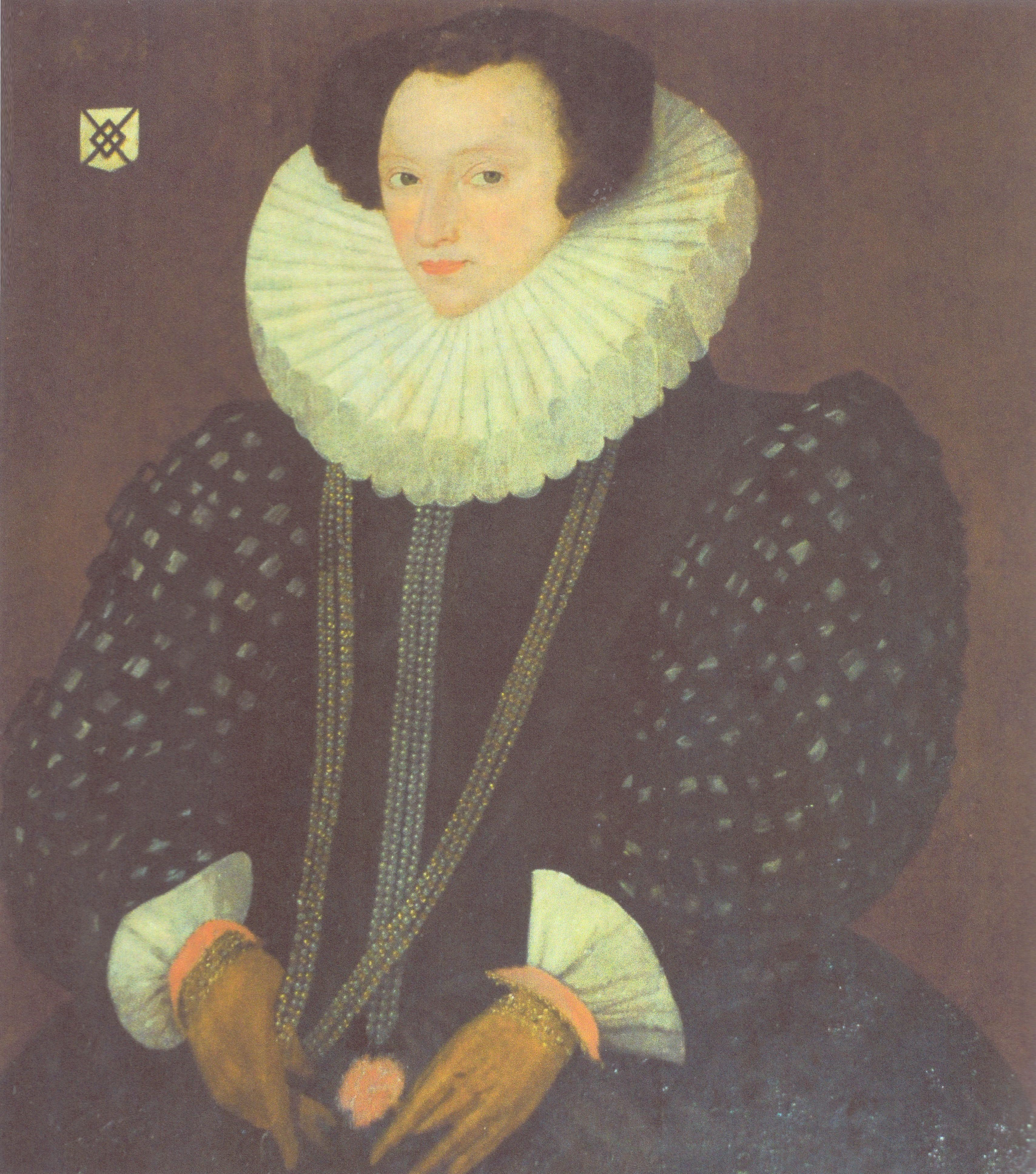
- ?Katherine, Lady Tollemache, 1592 by Robert Peake the Elder
- Born: Catherine Cromwell; 1557
- Died: 24 March 1621 (aged 63–64)
- Buried: St Mary's Church, Helmingham
- Spouse: Lionel Tollemache, 1st Baronet (m. 1581; died 1612)
- Issue: Sir Lionel Tollemache, 2nd Baronet; Robert Tollemache; Edward Tollemache; Susan Tollemache; Mary Tollemache; Catherine Tollemache; Anne Tollemache
- Father: Henry Cromwell, 2nd Baron Cromwell
- Mother: Mary Paulet

Catherine or Katherine Tollemache (née Cromwell; 1557 – 24 March 1621) was an English aristocrat, who collected and wrote culinary and medical recipes, and was known for her healing skills.

== Family ==
She was the daughter of Henry Cromwell, 2nd Baron Cromwell and Mary Paulet, and lived at North Elmham in Norfolk. On 18 February 1581, she married Lionel Tollemache, of Helmingham, Suffolk. Their first son, John (a twin of Mary Tollemache), born at North Elmham, died in infancy. At this time, her uncle Thomas Cromwell and his wife, Katherine Gardiner, also lived at North Elmham.

She moved to Helmingham Hall. Seven of her children survived, including the heir to the estates, who was also called Lionel Tollemache. Her husband was made a baronet by James VI and I in May 1611 and a Knight of the Bath in 1612 He died soon after.

== The household at Helmingham Hall ==
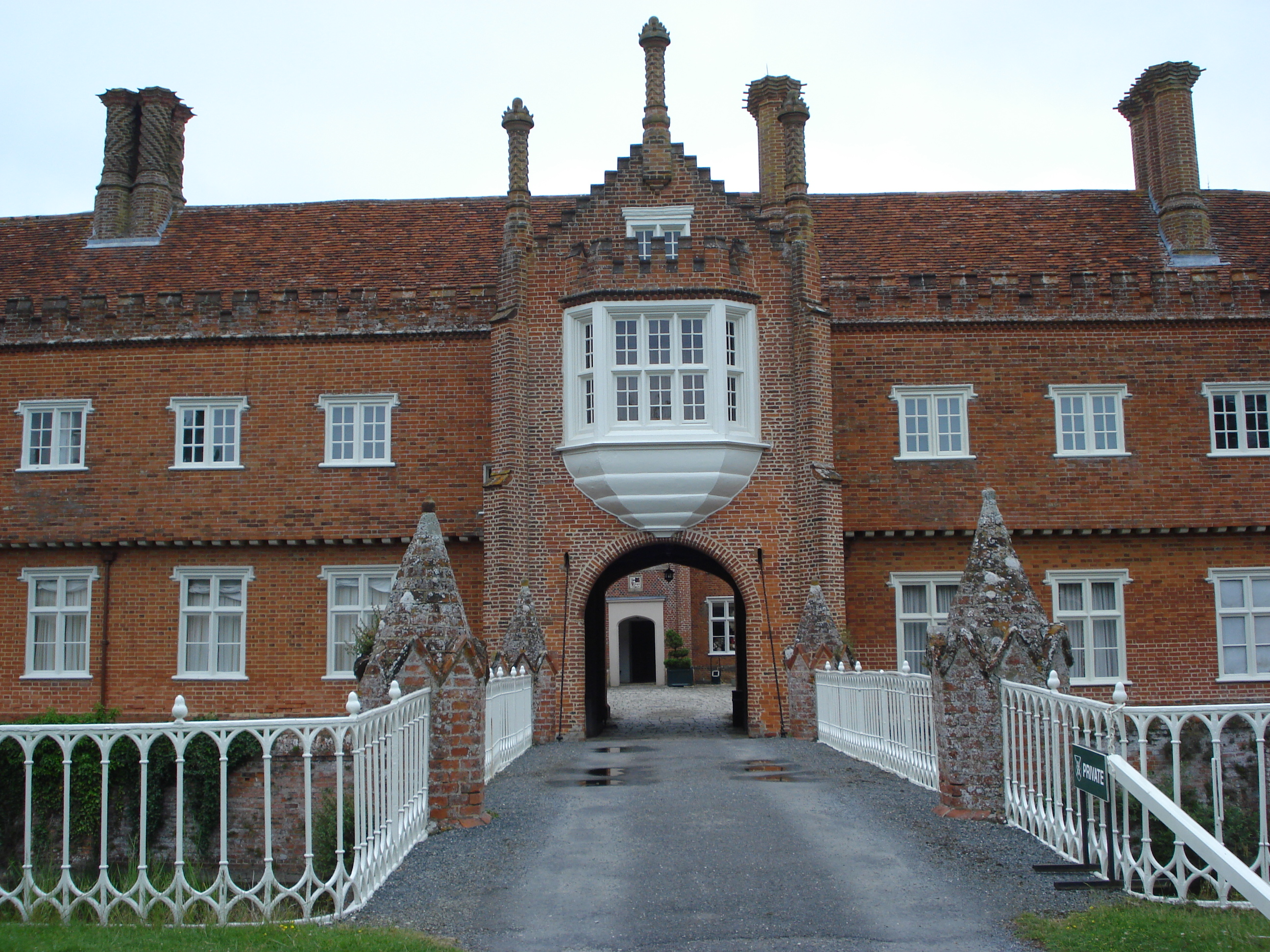
Helmingham Hall

The main family home was Helmingham Hall. Catherine Tollemache and her servant, the steward George Smyth, kept accounts. Family papers from this time document the servants, and purchases made for house, and clothes bought for the family, while an inventory of 1597 details the spaces where household work and food preparation took place including the "stilling yard", workhouse, and "soap house". Stills and limbecks were kept in the "still yard" room, a similar room at Apethorpe used by the Countess of Westmorland was called the "steelehouse". The room at Helmingham was not listed in an inventory of the house made in 1626 after Catherine's death, an indication that this kind of domestic production was not then practised.

In 1605, Catherine Tollemache wrote to her London tailor, Roger Jones, about farthingale sleeves covered with satin for a new gown, and he suggested another style of sleeve would be "fytter". In his reply, Jones described gowns he made for a guest at the wedding of a son of Lord Burghley.

== Recipes and recipe books ==
Manuscripts written and owned by Catherine Tollemache remain in the family collection. Her collection of medieval recipes Catherine Tollemache's Secrets and her own contemporary Receipts for Pastery, Confectionary, etc were published in 2001.

The title Receipts for Pastery was added after her death. The material does not describe the usual daily meals in the household, made by the kitchen staff, but rather the production of sweetmeats, distilled waters and conserves, including quince marmalade and cotignac, with which she would have been personally involved. Some of the ingredients were grown in her garden, while recorded purchases include "poticary stuff", materials for apothecaries. She outlines making artificial fruit from sugar paste called "manus Christi" set in a mould made from plaster-of paris ("alabaster"), and painted with umber and sap green pigments obtained from a professional painter.

In another manuscript miscellany of recipes, known as Catherine Tollemache's Recipes, she wrote her name, "Catheren Tallemach ow[n]eth this boocke".

Catherine Tollemache also owned a copy of the 1600 edition of the printed book, John Partridge's Treasurie, now owned by the Folger Shakespeare Library. The Treasurie includes recipes for confectionary and household tips.

== Later life and death ==
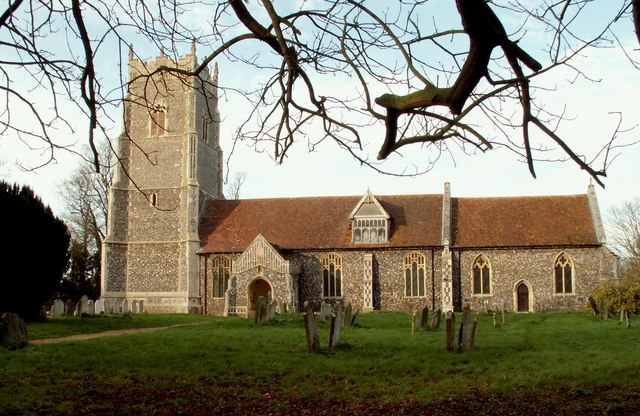
Catherine Tollemache's monument at St Mary's Helmingham mentions her surgical skill and care for the sick and wounded.

After her husband's death in 1612, Catherine lived in Ipswich. Catherine Tollemache died on 24 March 1621. Her memorial at St Mary's Church, Helmingham, gives her names as "Catharine Tallemache" and mentions her "skill & singular experience in chyrurgerie", that is "surgery".

Her portrait, attributed to Robert Peake the Elder, survives at Helmingham. In 2016, a British television programme Who Do You Think You Are? revealed that the actor and presenter Danny Dyer was a 12x great grandson of Catherine Tollemache through her daughter Anne.

== Issue ==
Catherine Tollemache's children included:

- Sir Lionel Tollemache, 2nd Baronet (1591–1640), who married Elizabeth Stanhope, a daughter of John Stanhope, 1st Baron Stanhope and Margaret, a daughter of Henry Macwilliam. They had six daughters, and a son Sir Lionel Tollemache, 3rd Baronet (1624–1669), who married Elizabeth Murray. Their children included Catherine Tollemache, Countess of Sutherland.
- Robert Tollemache, who married Dorothy, daughter of John Lane in Staffordshire
- Edward Tollemache (baptised 20 June 1596)
- Susan Tollemache, who married Sir Henry D'Oyly of Shottisham. Their son Edmund D'Oyly (died 1638) married Bridget, a daughter of John Coke of Holkham, and had a daughter Susan. Their estates were inherited by their nephew William D'Oyly, first of the D'Oyly baronets.
- Mary Tollemache
- Katherine or Catherine Tollemache.
- Anne Tollemache, who married Robert Gosnold of Otley in 1609.
