= Henry Cromwell, 2nd Baron Cromwell =

English nobleman

Henry Cromwell
- Baron Cromwell
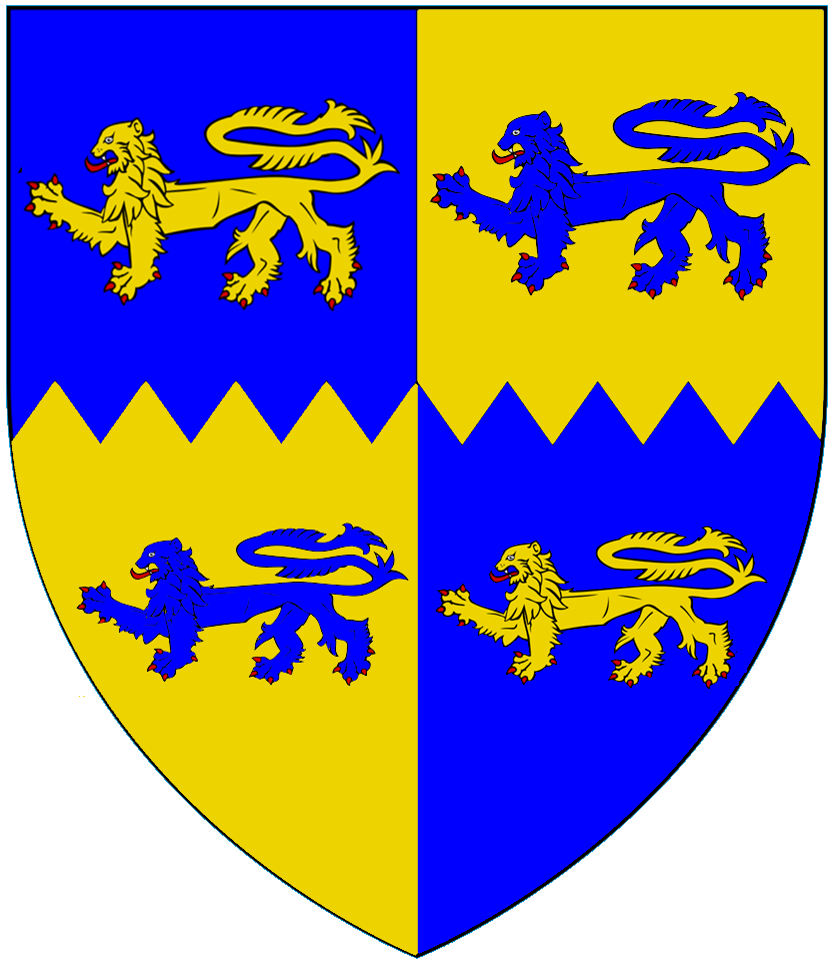
- Arms of Cromwell, Baron Cromwell: Quarterly, per fess indented, azure and or, four lions passant counterchanged
- Tenure: 1551–1592
- Successor: Edward Cromwell, 3rd Baron Cromwell
- Known for: Son of Gregory Cromwell, 1st Baron Cromwell
- Born: Henry Cromwell; 1538
- Died: 20 November 1592 (aged 53–54); Launde Abbey, Leicestershire, England
- Buried: Launde Abbey Chapel; 52.6313°N 0.82312°W
- Residence: Launde Abbey
- Locality: Leicestershire
- Spouse: Mary Paulet
- Issue: Edward Cromwell, 3rd Baron Cromwell; Sir Gregory Cromwell; Katherine Cromwell
- Parents: Gregory Cromwell, 1st Baron Cromwell; Elizabeth Seymour

Henry Cromwell, 2nd Baron Cromwell (before 1 March 1538 – 20 November 1592), the son of Gregory Cromwell, 1st Baron Cromwell and Elizabeth Seymour, was an English peer during the reign of Elizabeth I. He was the grandson of Henry VIII's chief minister, Thomas Cromwell, 1st earl of Essex, nephew of the Protector Somerset and first cousin of Edward VI.

== Family ==
Henry Cromwell was the eldest son of Gregory Cromwell, 1st baron Cromwell, only son and heir of Thomas Cromwell, and Elizabeth, widow of Sir Anthony Ughtred (d. 1534), daughter of Sir John Seymour of Wolf Hall, Wiltshire, and Margery Wentworth. He was baptised on 1 March 1538, probably at Hampton Court, where the Lady Mary almost certainly stood as godmother. Shortly after the baptism, his parents left for Lewes in Sussex to the former Cluniac Priory of St. Pancras, recently acquired by his grandfather, where they remained from March 1538 until early 1539, when they took up residence in Leeds Castle, Kent.

Henry's grandfather, Thomas Cromwell, had been created Baron Cromwell of Wimbledon in 1536 and Earl of Essex in 1540 as a reward for his service as chief minister to Henry VIII, but he had lost those titles by attainder in June 1540. On 18 December 1540, his son Gregory was created 1st Baron Cromwell. This title was a new creation rather than a restoration of his father's forfeited barony. Henry succeeded his father as the second Baron Cromwell under that creation. A minor at his father's premature death from sweating sickness on 4 July 1551, he was first summoned to Parliament in 1563.

His mother remarried, in 1554, Sir John Paulet, later Lord St John. She died 19 March 1568, and was buried 5 April at Basing, Hampshire. His stepfather later married, before 30 September 1568, Winifred, widow of Sir Richard Sackville, and daughter of John Brydges, a former Lord Mayor of London. He succeeded his father as Marquess of Winchester in 1572.

Cromwell was educated at St John's College, Cambridge, where he matriculated in 1553. He may have been admitted to Lincoln's Inn, 7 March 1557. His siblings included brother Thomas Cromwell and half-brother Sir Henry Ughtred, and his brother-in-law was William Paulet, later 3rd Marquess of Winchester.

He was arrested in 1572 for contempt of court (an injunction in the Court of Chancery) but the House of Lords insisted on his release since as a peer he was immune from arrest in civil actions.

== Marriage and issue ==
Cromwell married, before 1560, Mary (c. 1540 – 10 October 1592), the daughter of his stepfather John Paulet, 2nd Marquess of Winchester and his first wife Elizabeth Willoughby, and by her had issue:

- Edward Cromwell, 3rd Baron Cromwell, (c. 1559 – 27 April 1607), married firstly, Elizabeth Upton (died 1592/3), of Puslinch, Devon by whom he had a daughter, Elizabeth and secondly, Frances Rugge, (d. 1631) of Felmingham, Norfolk, by whom he had a son, Thomas Cromwell, 1st Earl of Ardglass and two daughters, Frances and Anne. He served with the Earl of Essex in the expedition against Spain and was knighted by him in Dublin on 12 July 1599.
- Sir Gregory Cromwell, married Frances, daughter of Sir Edward Griffin (d. 1620) of Dingley, Northamptonshire. He was knighted by James I at Belvoir Castle 23 April 1603.
- Katharine Cromwell (d. 24 March 1621), married on 10 February 1581 at North Elmham, Norfolk, Sir Lionel Tollemache, 1st Baronet, of Helmingham, Suffolk (before 14 December 1562 – 1612), son of Sir Lionel Tollemache and Susan Jermyn. They had a son, Sir Lionel Tollemache, 2nd Baronet.

== Death ==
Cromwell's wife died at North Elmham, Norfolk, 10 October 1592, and was buried, on 23 October, at Launde Abbey Leicestershire. He died on 20 November following at North Elmham, Norfolk and was buried, 4 December, in the chapel at Launde Abbey, Launde, Leicestershire.

== Bibliography ==
- Aspinall-Oglander, Cecil (1946). Nunwell Symphony. London: Hogarth Press.
- Bindoff, S. T. (1982). "Cromwell, Thomas (by 1485–1540), of London". In Bindoff, S. T. (ed.). Members. The History of Parliament: the House of Commons 1509–1558. Historyofparliamentonline.org. Archived from the original on 7 May 2014.
- Burke, John (1831). A General and Heraldic Dictionary of The Peerages of England, Ireland and Scotland, Extinct, Dormant, and in Abeyance. London: Henry Colburn and Richard Bentley.
- Burke, J.B. (1866). A Genealogical History of the Dormant, Abeyant, Forfeited And Extinct Peerages in the British Empire. London, UK: Harrison.
- Carthew, G. A. (1878). The Hundred of Launditch and Deanery of Brisley; in the County of Norfolk; Evidences and Topographical Notes from public records, Heralds' Visitations, Wills, Court Rolls, Old Charters, Parish Registers, Town books, and Other Private Sources; Digested and Arranged as Materials for Parochial, Manorial, and Family History. Vol. II. Collected by G.A. Carthew. Norwich: Printed by Miller and Leavins – via HathiTrust.
- Cokayne, G. E. (1898). Complete Peerage of England, Scotland, Ireland, Great Britain and the United Kingdom, Extant, Extinct or Dormant. Vol. VIII. Exeter: William Pollard.
- Cokayne, G. E. (1900). Complete Baronetage. Vol. I: 1611–1625. Exeter: William Pollard & Co.
- Cokayne, G. E. (1983). Complete Baronetage. Vol. I. Gloucester: Alan Sutton Publishing.
- Cokayne, G. E. (1913). Gibbs, Vicary (ed.). The Complete Peerage of England, Scotland, Ireland, Great Britain and the United Kingdom. Vol. III. London: St. Catherine Press.
- Cokayne, G. E. (1916). Gibbs, Vicary (ed.). The Complete Peerage of England, Scotland, Ireland, Great Britain and the United Kingdom. Vol. IV. London: St. Catherine Press.
- Colby, Frederic Thomas, ed. (1872). The Visitation of the County of Devon in the Year 1620. Publications of the Harleian Society. Vol. VI. London: Printed by Taylor and Co.
- College of Arms; Black, William Henry; Young, Charles George (1829). Catalogue of the Arundel Manuscripts in the Library of the College of Arms. [By William Henry Black. With a Preface Signed: C. G. Y., i.e. Sir Charles George Young]. London: Printed by S. and R. Bentley. p. 63. OCLC 719406887.
- Ferris, John P. (2010). "Tollemache (Talmash), Sir Lionel, 2nd Bt. (1591-1640), of Helmingham Hall, Suff.; Brunt Hall, Great Fakenham, Suff. and Charing Cross, Westminster". In Thrush, Andrew; Ferris, John P. (eds.). Members. The History of Parliament: The House of Commons 1604-1629. Historyofparliamentonline.org.
- Flower, William (1881). Norcliffe, Charles Best (ed.). The Visitation of Yorkshire in the Years 1563 and 1564, Made by William Flower, Esquire, Norroy King of Arms. The Publications of the Harleian Society. Vol. XVI. London: Harleian Society.
- Fuidge, N. M. (1981). "Ughtred, Henry (by 1534-aft. Oct. 1598), of Southampton and Ireland". In Hasler, P. W. (ed.). Members. The History of Parliament: The House of Commons 1558–1603. Historyofparliamentonline.org. Archived from the original on 13 January 2021.
- Great Britain. Public Record Office (1939). Calendar of the Patent Rolls Preserved in the Public Record Office: Elizabeth [I]. Vol. 1: 1558–1560. London: His Majesty's Stationery Office. p. 73. OCLC 962334 – via HathiTrust.
- Hawkyard, A. D. K. (1982). "Cromwell, Gregory (by 1516–51), of Lewes, Suss.; Leeds Castle, Kent and Launde, Leics.". In Bindoff, S. T. (ed.). Members. The History of Parliament: the House of Commons 1509–1558. Historyofparliamentonline.org.
- Lee, Sidney (1888). "Cromwell, Edward" . In Stephen, Leslie (ed.). Dictionary of National Biography. Vol. 13. London: Smith, Elder & Co. pp. 151–152.
- "Letters and Papers, Foreign and Domestic, Henry VIII". British-history.ac.uk.
- MacCulloch, Diarmaid (2018). Thomas Cromwell: A Life. London: Allen Lane. ISBN 9780141967660.
- MacMahon, Luke (2004). "Ughtred, Sir Anthony". Oxford Dictionary of National Biography (online ed.). Oxford University Press. doi:10.1093/ref:odnb/27979. (Subscription, Wikipedia Library access or UK public library membership required.)
- Metcalfe, Walter C. (1885). A Book of Knights Banneret, Knights of the Bath, and Knights Bachelor. London: Mitchell and Hughes.
- Nichols, John (1800). The History and Antiquities of the County of Leicester. Vol. III. London: J. Nichols.
- Mosley, Charles, ed. (2003). Burke's Peerage, Baronetage and Knightage. Vol. 1 (107th ed.). Wilmington: Burke's Peerage & Gentry LLC. ISBN 0971196621.
- Noble, Mark (1784). Memoirs of Several Persons and Families Who, by Females are Allied to, or Descended from the Protectorate-House of Cromwell. Birmingham: Pearson and Rollason. p. 8.
- Richardson, Douglas (2011). Everingham, Kimball G. (ed.). Magna Carta Ancestry: A Study in Colonial and Medieval Families. Vol. III (2nd ed.). Douglas Richardson. ISBN 978-1461045205.
- Richardson, Douglas (2011). Everingham, Kimball G. (ed.). Plantagenet Ancestry: A Study in Colonial and Medieval Families. Vol. I (2nd ed.). CreateSpace. ISBN 978-1461045137.
- Shaw, W.A.; Burtchaell, B.D. (1906). The Knights of England: A Complete Record from the Earliest Time to the Present Day of the Knights of All the Orders of Chivalry in England, Scotland, and Ireland, and of Knights Bachelors, Incorporating a Complete List of Knights Bachelors Dubbed in Ireland. Vol. II. London: Sherratt and Hughes.
- Syvret, George S.; Carteret, Samuel de (1832). Chroniques des Iles de Jersey, Guernesey, Auregny et Serk (in French). Auquel on a ajouté un Abrégé Historique des dites Iles par Samuel de Carteret. Guernesey: de l'imprimerie de Thomas James Mauger.
- Thornton, Tim (2012). The Channel Islands, 1370–1640: Between England and Normandy. Woodbridge: The Boydell Press. ISBN 9781843837114.
- Venn, John; Venn, J. A. (1922). Alumni Cantabrigienses, A Biographical List of All Known Students, Graduates and Holders of Office at the University of Cambridge, From the Earliest Times to 1900. Part I: From the Earliest Times to 1751. Vol. I. Cambridge: Cambridge University Press.
- Wood, Mary Anne Everett (1846). Letters of Royal and Illustrious Ladies of Great Britain ... Vol. II. London: Henry Colburn.

Peerage of England
Preceded by Gregory Cromwell	Baron Cromwell; 1551–1592	Succeeded by Edward Cromwell
