= Helmingham Hall Hoard =

British Roman coin hoard dating to Roman invasion

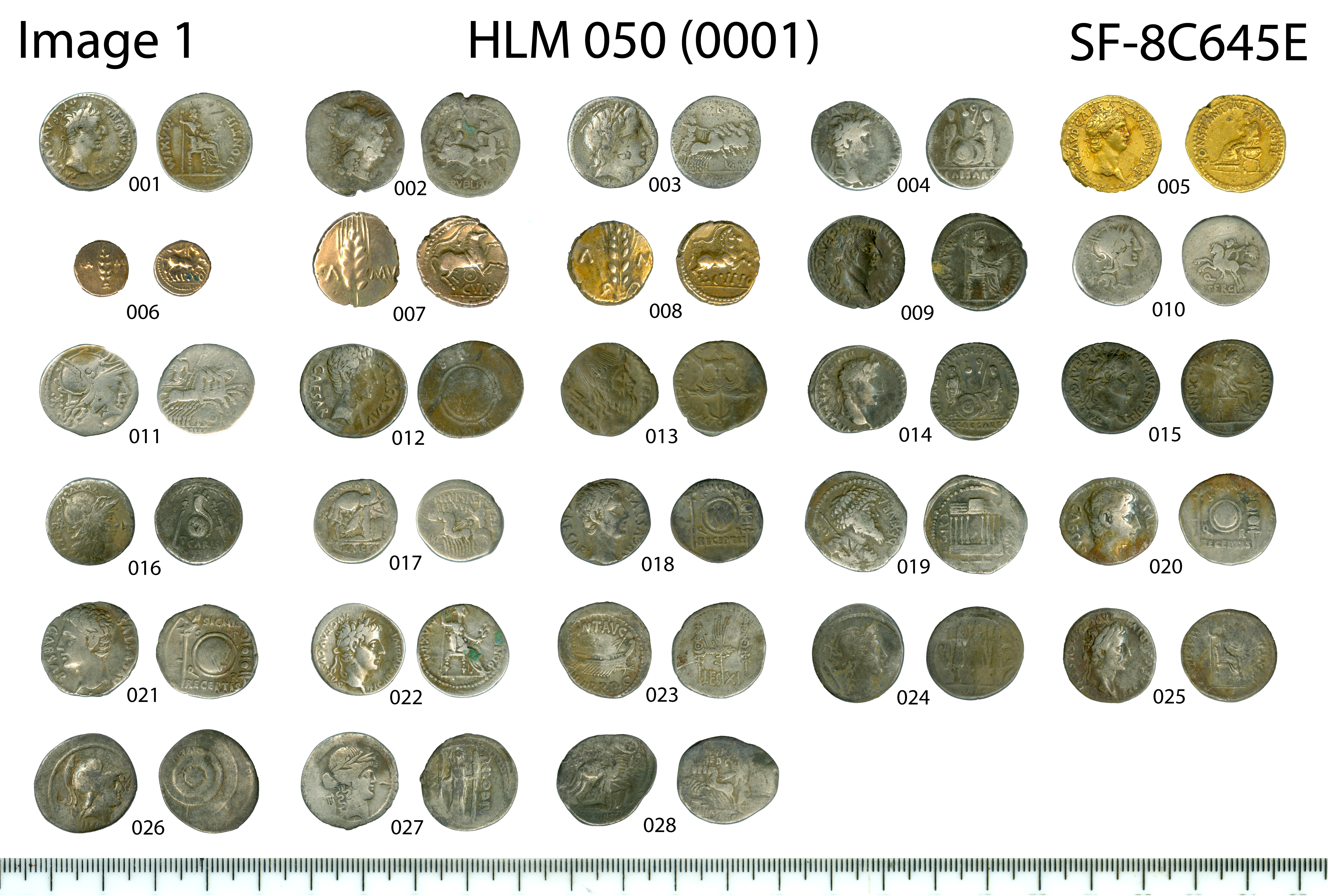
- Assorted coins from the hoard
- Type: coin hoard
- Material: Grey ware, Celtic Gold Staters, Silver Denarii, One aureus of Claudius
- Created: 47 AD
- Period/culture: Roman invasion of Britain
- Discovered: 9 September 2019 - 2021; Helmingham Hall
- Discovered by: George Ridgway
- Present location: British Museum, Colchester and Ipswich Museums Service, private collections
- Registration: Portable Antiquities Scheme Treasure 2019T794, 2020T915, 2021T655
- Culture: British Iron Age, Roman Britain
- https://finds.org.uk/database/artefacts/record/id/970233

The Helmingham Hall hoard is a Roman British coin hoard found near the grounds of Helmingham Hall around Helmingham and Stowmarket, Suffolk, dating at latest to the reign of Claudius, during the Roman conquest of Britain in the year 47 AD.

Discovered in 8 September 2019, with subsequent finds in 2020-2021, the hoard consist of 748 gold and silver denarii, a blend of Iron Age, Roman Republic, Triumvirate, and Roman Imperial currency, the largest of its time, ranging from the reign of Cunobeline to Claudius.

The hoard is documented in the Portable Antiquities Scheme as designated Treasure under the Case Numbers 2019T794 and 2020T915.

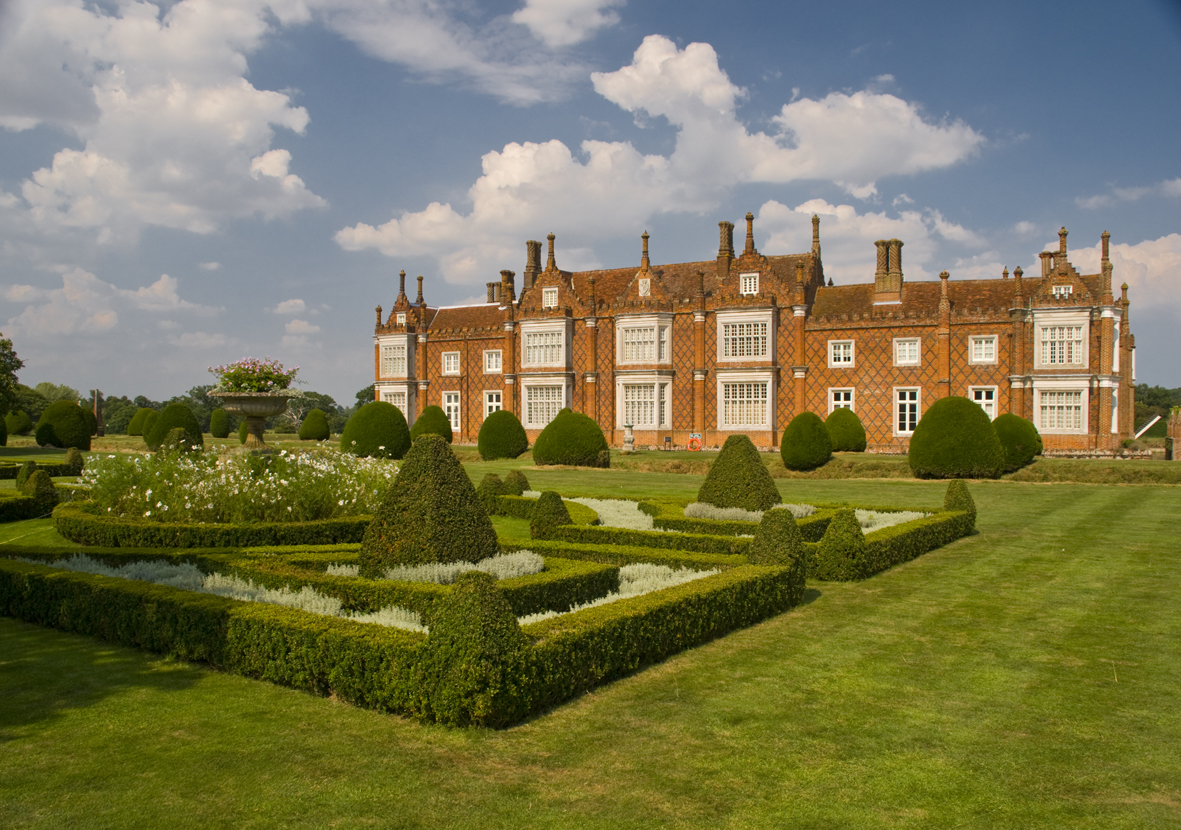
Helmingham Hall

== Discovery ==
Helmingham Hall, is situated 27 miles north of Camulodunum, or Roman Colchester, which was the foothold of what would be Britannia province, with Legio XX Valeria Victrix establishing their base.

With the latest coin in the hoard dating to 47 AD, the deposit was made contemporary to an Iceni revolt the same year, documented in Tacitus' Histories (12.31), which occurred 65 miles north of the estate at Stonea Camp.

In 9 September 2019, metal detectorist George Ridgway detected in the grounds of the hall with the permission of its owners. In a space that was a pond in the 19th century, but in present day a barley field, the ground was scattered with fibulae from the 1st century. The first find was a denarius of Julius Caesar, less than a metre below the surface, showing signs of historic plough damage. This was followed by 206 coins in a 1.5 meter square space.

Excavations with the local archaeological authority over the next three months yielded 205 coins, with 314 additional coins found within a 60 yard radius of the initial find. Ridgway returned to the site in 2020 and 2021, and found 9 and 14 pieces from the hoard respectively.

63 coins were given to the British Museum and the Colchester and Ipswich Museums.

On 18 September 2024, Noonans Mayfair auctioned the lots with an estimate of £75000. They sold for a collective £132,865, split between Ridgway and Helmingham Hall's owners.

== Description ==
The hoard comprises 748 Iron Age and Roman coins, 734 documented and catalogued by the Portable Antiquities Scheme, the oldest coin dating to the Roman Republic in 206 BC to the latest coin a denarius issued by Claudius in 46-47 AD.

Reign and Administration	Quantity (all denarii unless stated)
Cunobeline	19 (15 gold stater, 4 gold quarter stater)
Roman Republic	483
Mark Antony	57
Juba I of Numidia	1
Augustus	81 (1 irregular coin)
Tiberius	83
Gaius Caesar	2
Claudius	4 (1 aureus issued 41-42 AD)
Unknown	2

In addition, 35 shards of clay pottery, weighing 70.65 grams were recovered from the hoard. Made of grey ware, the fragments are all believed to be from one vessel, which was used to store the coins.

== See also ==
- List of Roman hoards in Great Britain
- Chilfrome Hoard - contemporary hoard found in Dorset in 2021.
- Worcestershire Conquest Hoard - a hoard of a similar type and era during the Roman Conquest of Britain, discovered in 2023.
- Bunnik Hoard - a hoard of similar composition and era, discovered 2023 in Bunnik, Netherlands
