= Sir Lionel Tollemache, 2nd Baronet =

English noble, surgeon & politician (1591-1640)

Lionel Tollemache
- 2nd Baronet of Helmingham
- Arms of Tollemache: Argent, a fret sable
- Successor: Sir Lionel Tollemache, 3rd Baronet
- Born: 2 August 1591; Helmingham Hall, Helmingham, Suffolk, England
- Baptised: 15 August 1591; Helmingham
- Died: 6 September 1640 (aged 49); Tilbury, Essex, England
- Buried: St. Mary's Church, Helmingham, Suffolk; 52.1735°N 1.2024°E
- Noble family: Tollemache
- Spouse: Elizabeth Stanhope
- Issue: Lionel; Jane; Elizabeth; Anne
- Father: Sir Lionel Tollemache, 1st Baronet
- Mother: Katherine Cromwell
- Occupation: MP for Orford

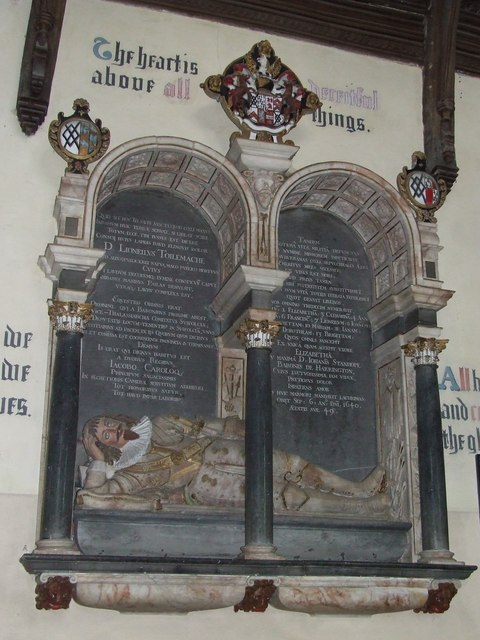
Mural monument to Sir Lionel Tollemache, 2nd Baronet, St Mary's Church, Helmingham

Sir Lionel Tollemache, 2nd Baronet (2 August 1591 – 6 September 1640) PC, of Helmingham Hall in Suffolk, was twice elected as a Member of Parliament for Orford in Suffolk, in 1621 and 1628. He had a considerable reputation as a surgeon, but is said to have made many enemies due to his "immoderate temper".

== Origins ==
He was born on 2 August 1591, the son and heir of Sir Lionel Tollemache, 1st Baronet (1562–1612) of Helmingham, and Katharine Cromwell, daughter of Henry Cromwell, 2nd Baron Cromwell and Mary Paulet.

== Career ==
He was knighted at the Palace of Whitehall on 15 November 1612 and succeeded to the baronetcy and estate of Helmingham on the death of his father in 1612. In 1621 he was elected a Member of Parliament for Orford in Suffolk. He was a Privy Councillor to King James I and Charles I. In 1628 he was elected an MP for Orford again and sat until 1629 when King Charles embarked on his period of Personal Rule without parliament for eleven years.

== Marriage and children ==
Arms of Stanhope: Quarterly ermine and gules, as impaled by Tollemache on his monument in St Mary's Church, Helmingham

On 16 December 1612 at St Martin in the Fields, Westminster he married Elizabeth Stanhope, a daughter of John Stanhope, 1st Baron Stanhope of Harrington (by his second wife Margaret McWilliams), by whom he had a son and six daughters, including:

- Sir Lionel Tollemache, 3rd Baronet (1624–1669), son and heir;
- Jane Tollemache, who married Thomas Cholmondeley (1627–1702);
- Elizabeth Tollemache, who married firstly William Alington, 1st Baron Alington, and secondly Sir William Compton, Master of the Ordnance (died 1663);
- Anne Tollemache, who married Sir Robert Broke, 1st Baronet.
- Catherine Tollemache, who married Charles Mordaunt, 3rd Baronet
- Susannah Tollemache, who married Sir Henry Felton, 2nd Baronet

== Death and burial ==
Tollemache died suddenly at Tilbury in Essex on 6 September 1640, in his 49th year, and was buried in St Mary's Church, Helmingham, where survives his mural monument with semi-recumbent effigy, commenced by his father and completed by himself.

== Notes ==
Parliament of England
Preceded by Sir William Cornwallis; Sir Francis Baildon	Member of Parliament for Orford; 1621–1622; With: Sir Roger Townshend	Succeeded by Sir Robert Hitcham; William Glover
Preceded by Sir Robert Hitcham; Charles Croft	Member of Parliament for Orford; 1628–1629; With: Sir Charles Legross	Parliament suspended until 1640
Baronetage of England
Preceded by Lionel Tollemache	Baronet (of Helmingham Hall); 1621–1640	Succeeded by Lionel Tollemache
