= Bunnik Hoard =

Roman British Conquest Hoard discovered in the Netherlands in 2023

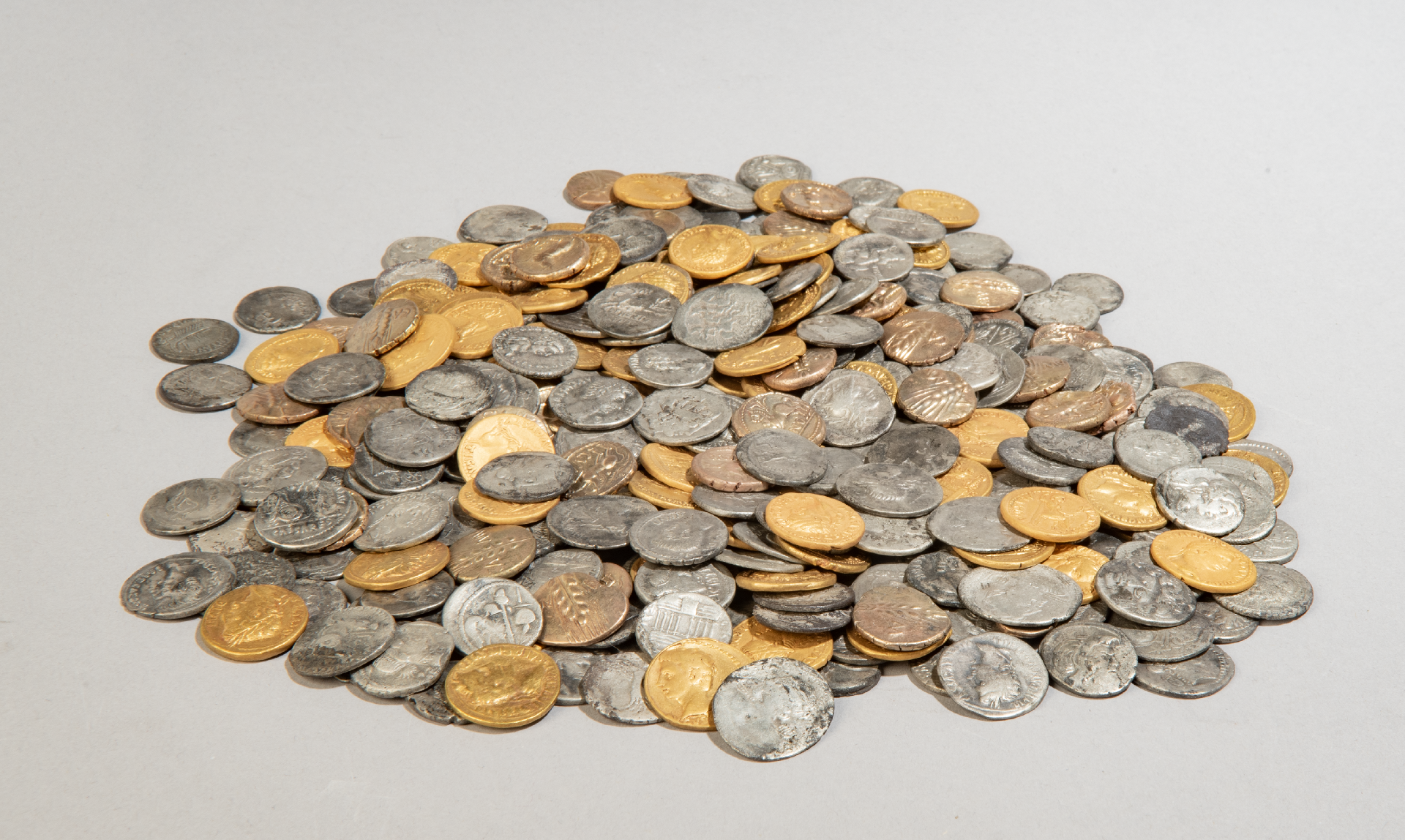
- Coins laid out from the Bunnik Hoard (Rijksmuseum van Oudheden)
- Material: 404 Iron Age and Roman gold and silver coins
- Created: 47 AD
- Period/culture: Reign of Claudius (41–54 AD)
- Discovered: 2023; Bunnik, Utrecht, Netherlands
- Culture: Roman Britain

The Bunnik Hoard is a Romano-British coin hoard discovered in the village of Bunnik, Netherlands. The hoard consists of 404 coins of Celtic, Roman, and Numidian origin which were deposited in 47 AD. It is notable as the largest hoard found in Utrecht and the first mixed composition hoard found outside of Great Britain. As part of the Limes Germanicus, the Roman Netherlands had a strong Roman military presence and many fortifications. It served as a launch base for the Roman conquest of Britain.

== Discovery ==
In Autumn 2023, two metal detectorists, Gert-Jan Messelaar and Reinier Koelink, were combing the fields for a fruit grower's tractor key in Houten, before moving on to neighboring Bunnik, where they had recovered some coins in the past.

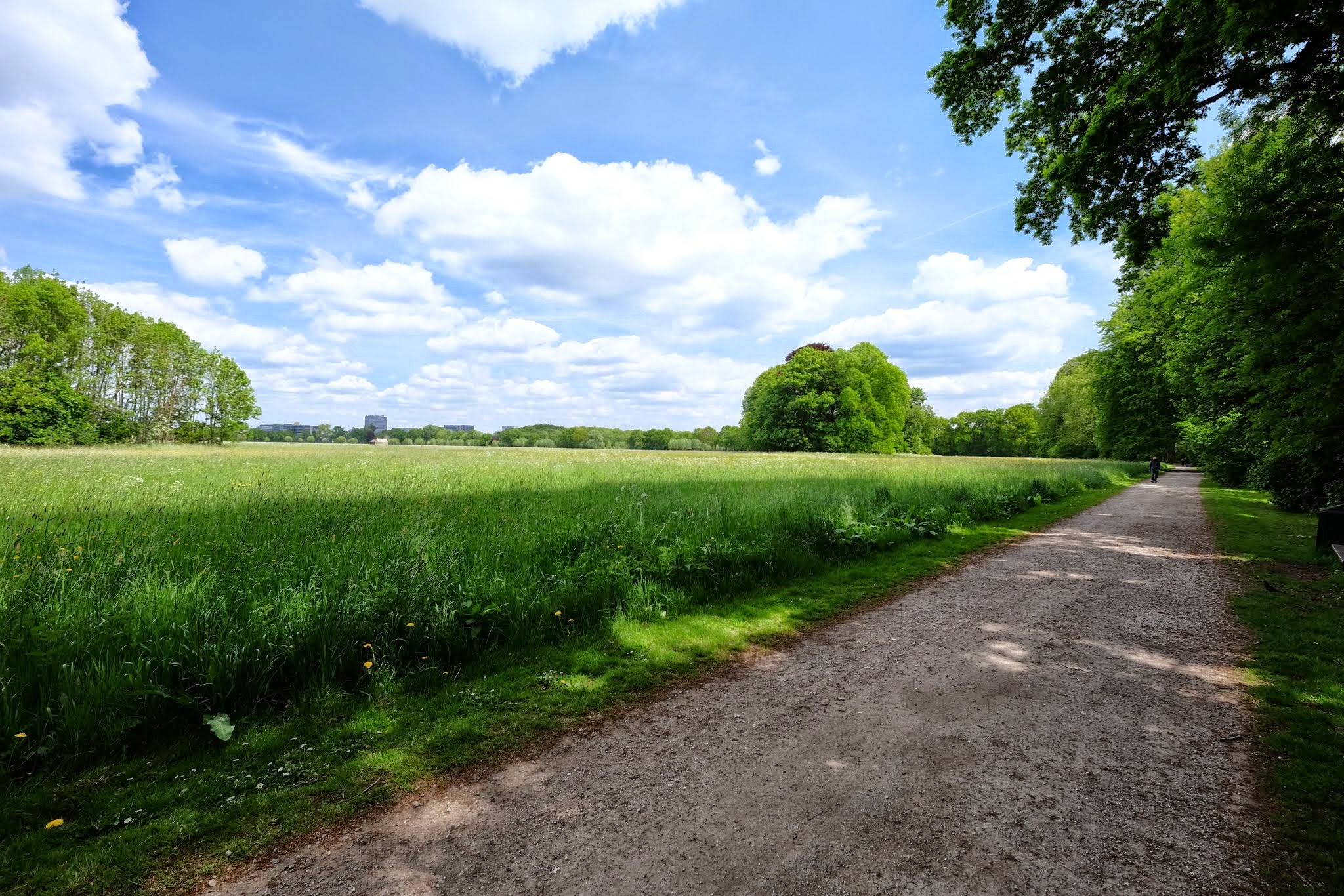
Bunnik, Netherlands

The first coin Koelink found was lying on the surface, a Celtic stater, normally only found in Britain. Messelaar thereafter found the rest of the hoard, clumped together in the mud. After disassembling the hoard, the findings were reported to the Rijksdienst voor het Cultureel Erfgoed. Later excavations added 23 coins to the detectorists' 381, for a total of 404 silver and gold coins, many of which were located less than 30 cm below the surface.

In order to prevent looting, the exact location of the find was left undisclosed to the public. It is known to be around the A12 motorway, far from known Roman fortifications. An in-depth breakdown of the find is set to be published in 2026.

The hoard is currently on display at the Rijksmuseum van Oudheden, in Leiden as part of the permanent exhibit "The Netherlands in Roman Times".

== Content ==
The 404 coins include several Celtic staters, Roman Republican and Imperial currency, and a denarius of Juba I of Numidia (minted in Utica, Tunisia). The Bunnik Hoard is described by the Coin Hoards of the Roman Empire Project as "the largest Roman coin hoard ever discovered in Utrecht and the first mixed composition hoard found in mainland Europe". The hoard is registered by the University of Oxford's Coin Hoards of the Roman Empire database under ID No. 21255.

Hoard Breakdown
Reign	Years	Mint	Denomination	Quantity
Juba I of Numidia	60 – 46 BC: king of Numidia	Utica	Denarius	1
Cunobeline	about AD 9 – about 40: king in pre-Roman Britain		Stater	42
Cunobeline	about AD 9 – about 40: king in pre-Roman Britain		Quarter-Stater	2
Mark Antony		Travelling Mint	Denarius	30
Octavian	27 BC – AD 14: first Roman emperor	Travelling Mint	Denarius	3
Unknown			Denarius	179
Julius Caesar	49: temporaneous dictator of Rome – 46: annual dictator – 44 BC: dictator perpetuo		Denarius	12
Augustus	27 BC – AD 14		Aureus	22
Augustus	27 BC – AD 14		Denarius	28
Gaius Caesar			Denarius	2
Tiberius	AD 14 – 37: Roman emperor	Lugdunum	Aureus	37
Tiberius	AD 14 – 37: Roman emperor	Lugdunum	Denarius	27
Claudius	AD 41 – 54: Roman emperor	Rome	Aureus	13
Claudius	AD 41 – 54: Roman emperor	Rome	Denarius	6

The coins of the hoard date between 200 BC and 47 AD. Because this is the date of the youngest coins, the burial of this hoard has been dated to 47 AD.

== See also ==
- Helmingham Hall Hoard – a Roman hoard date to 47 AD, discovered in Helmingham, Suffolk, United Kingdom between 2019 and 2021.
- Worcestershire Conquest Hoard – a Roman Conquest era hoard discovered in Worcestershire, United Kingdom in 2023.
- Chilfrome Hoard - a Roman hoard dating to 47 AD, discovered in Dorset in 2021.
