= Helmingham Dell =

Painting by John Constable

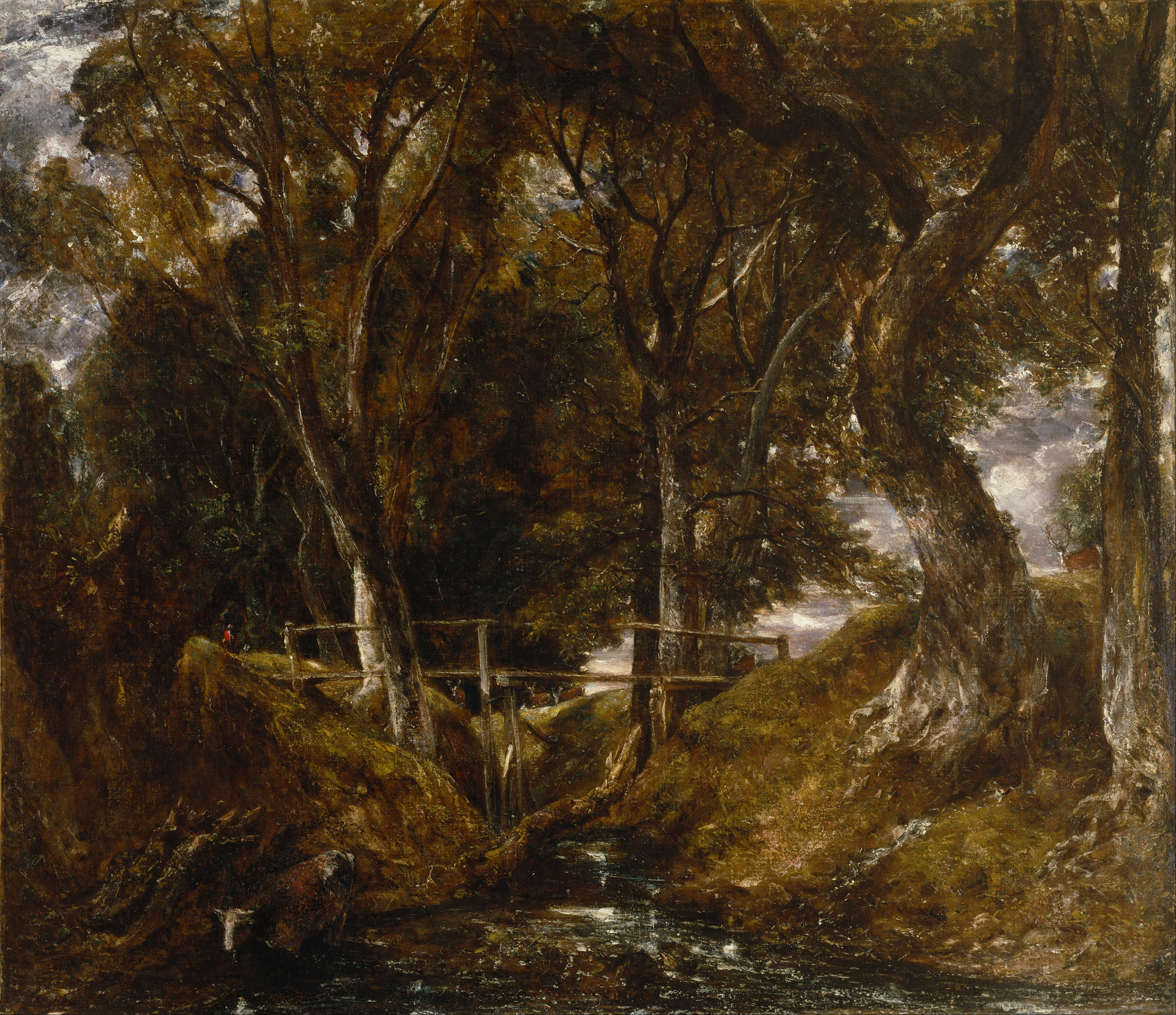
- Artist: John Constable
- Year: 1830
- Type: Oil on canvas, landscape painting
- Dimensions: 113.3 cm × 130.8 cm (44.62 in × 51.50 in)
- Location: Nelson-Atkins Museum of Art, Kansas City

Helmingham Dell is an 1830 landscape painting by the British artist John Constable featuring a view of a dell in the grounds of Helmingham Hall in Suffolk, with a young woman in red about to cross a bridge. It appears to have been based on a sketch made as early as 1800 when he first visited Helmingham.

In 1829 when Constable was elected to full membership of the Royal Academy in London he was required to provide a diploma work. He chose to present his 1826 landscape A Boat Passing a Lock which was owned by his friend the bookseller James Carpenter. In exchange for Carpenter giving up the work, Constable promised to produce another landscape for him featuring Helmingham. As the work progressed Constable chose to keep it and instead paid Carpenter for the loss of his original painting.

It was exhibited at Somerset House for the Royal Academy's Summer Exhibition of 1830. Today the painting is in the collection of the Nelson-Atkins Museum of Art in Kansas City, Missouri having been acquired in 1955. Constable had produced an earlier, smaller version of the same view in 1826, a work now in the Philadelphia Museum of Art. As well as being considerably larger, the 1830 work added a stag and a cow to the composition. Both paintings are unusual in his work for only featuring a small glimpse of sky.

== See also ==
- List of paintings by John Constable

== Bibliography ==
- Bailey, Anthony. John Constable: A Kingdom of his Own. Random House, 2012.
- Reynolds, Graham. Constable's England. Metropolitan Museum of Art, 1983.
- Thornes, John E. John Constable's Skies: A Fusion of Art and Science. A&C Black, 1999.
