= Lionel Tollemache, 4th Earl of Dysart =

English peer and landowner (1708–1770)

The Right Honourable The Earl of Dysart KT
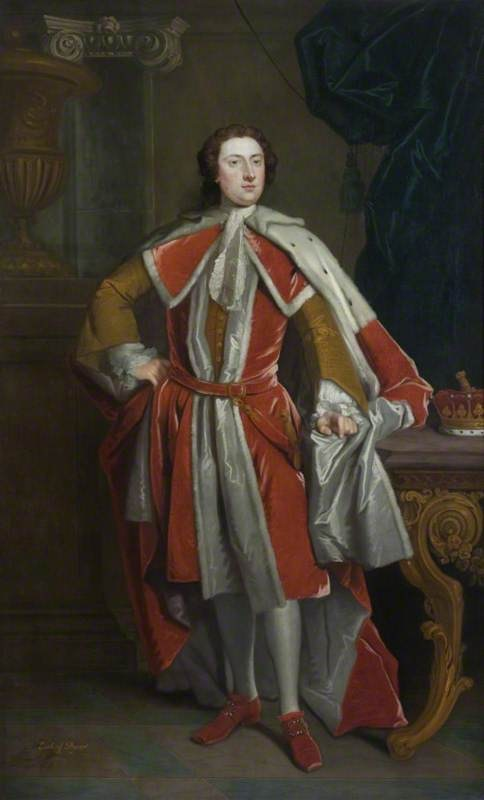
- Lionel Tollemache, 4th Earl of Dysart, 1730, by John Vanderbank the Younger (1694–1739)

4th Earl of Dysart
- Predecessor: Lionel Tollemache, 3rd Earl of Dysart
- Successor: Lionel Tollemache, 5th Earl of Dysart
- Known for: High Steward of Ipswich; Knight of the Thistle
- Born: 1 May 1708; England
- Died: 10 March 1770 (aged 61); London, England
- Noble family: Tollemache
- Spouse: Grace Carteret
- Issue: Lionel; Wilbrahim; Louisa, and others
- Father: Lionel Tollemache, Lord Huntingtower
- Mother: Henrietta Cavendish
- Occupation: Landowner

Lionel Tollemache, 4th Earl of Dysart, KT (1 May 1708 – 10 March 1770), styled Lord Huntingtower from 1712 to 1727, was an English peer and landowner.

Lionel's father, a namesake in 1712 predeceased his father Lionel Tollemache, 3rd Earl of Dysart – on the latter's death in 1727, Lionel inherited the earldom and five main estates: Ham House in Surrey, Helmingham Hall in Suffolk, Harrington and Bentley in Northamptonshire, and 20,000 acres (8,100 ha; 31 sq mi) in Cheshire. The following year he went on a Grand Tour.

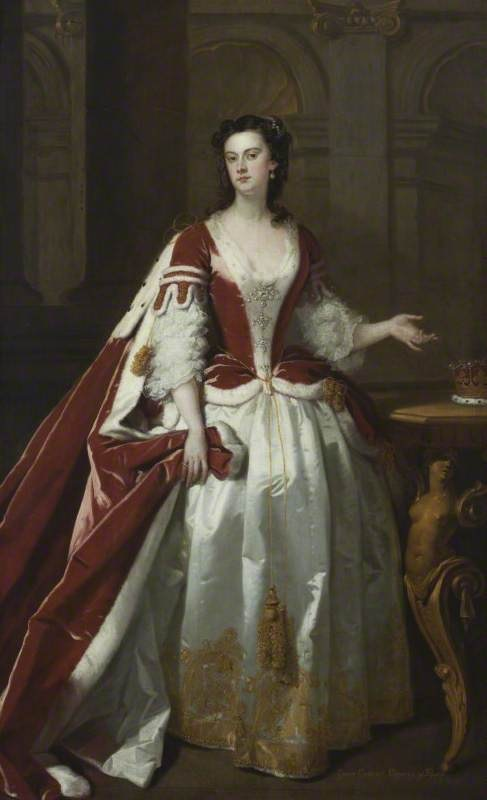
Lady Grace Carteret, Countess of Dysart, 1737, by John Vanderbank the Younger (1694–1739)

In 1729, he was elected High Steward of Ipswich, a post he held for 41 years.

== Family and Issue ==
In 1729, he married Lady Grace Carteret (1713–1755 St James's), daughter of John Carteret, 2nd Earl Granville, by whom he had sixteen children, nine of whom did not reach age 17:

- A son, Lord Huntingtower (born and died 21 May 1730);
- Lionel Tollemache, Lord Huntingtower (15 March 1731 – 16 March 1731);
- Lady Grace Tollemache (9 April 1732 – 10 May 1736);
- Lady Harriet Tollemache (died 2 August 1733);
- Lionel Tollemache, 5th Earl of Dysart (6 August 1734 – 20 February 1799);
- Lady Mary Tollemache (12 March 1736 – 14 March 1736);
- A son (born 24 June 1737, died young);
- Lady Frances Tollemache (c.1738 – 18 December 1807);
- Wilbraham Tollemache, 6th Earl of Dysart (21 October 1739 – 9 March 1821);
- Lady Catherine Tollemache (6 October 1740 – 24 May 1751);
- A son (died young);
- Hon. George Tollemache (14 March 1744 – 13 November 1760), joined the Royal Navy and was drowned on a voyage to Lisbon after falling from the mizzen topmast head of HMS Modeste.
- Louisa Tollemache, 7th Countess of Dysart (2 July 1745–1840), married John Manners in 1766;
- Capt. Hon. John Tollemache (3 October 1748 – 25 September 1777), married Lady Bridget Henley, daughter of Robert Henley, 1st Earl of Northington, on 3 December 1773, and had one son. The captain of HMS Zebra, Tollemache was killed in a duel in New York City with Lt-Col. Pennington over a sonnet written by the latter, reflecting on Lady Bridget's wit. Tollemache was run through the heart, and Pennington received seven wounds and nearly died.
  - John's son, Lionel Robert Tollemache (10 November 1774 – 14 July 1793), was informally adopted by his childless uncle, Lionel, following John's death. Commissioned an ensign in the Coldstream Guards on 28 January 1791, he was killed at the siege of Valenciennes, without issue.
- Lady Jane Tollemache (26 March 1750 – 28 August 1802), married John Delap Halliday (died 24 June 1794) on 23 October 1771 and had issue. Lady Halliday was painted by Sir Joshua Reynolds in 1779. She married secondly David George Ferry on 24 March 1802.
- Lt. Hon. William Tollemache (22 March 1751 – 16 December 1776), lieutenant of HMS Repulse, lost with the ship in a hurricane off Bermuda;

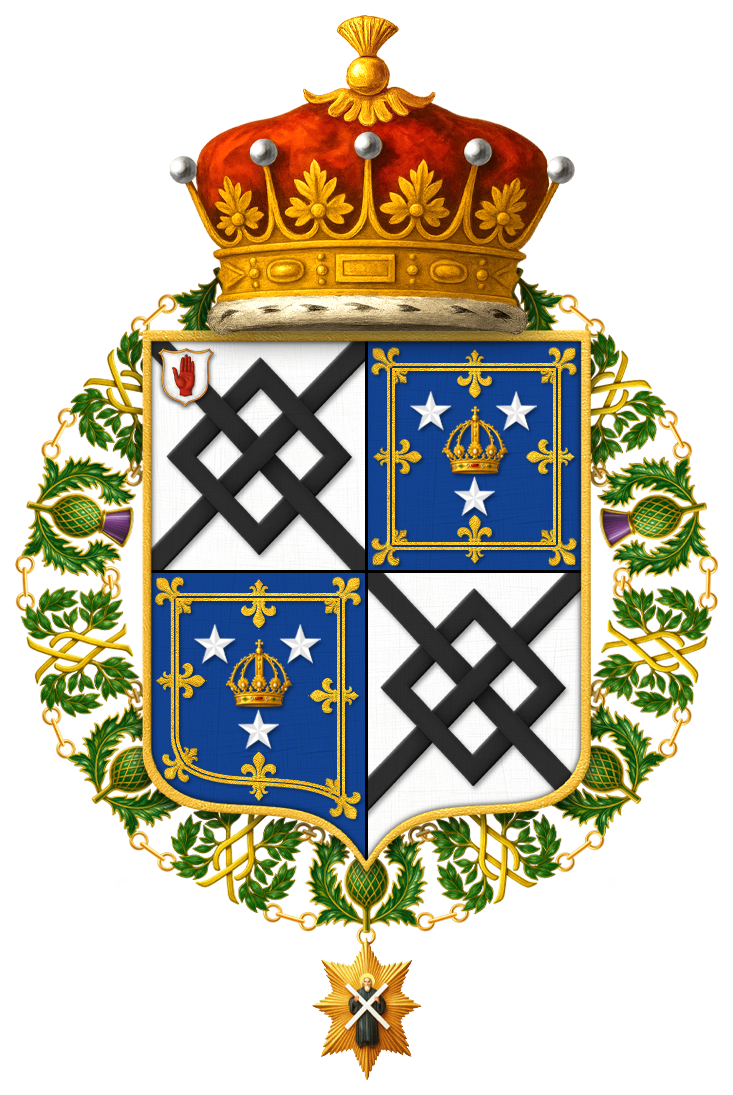
Shield of Arms of Lionel Tollemache, 4th Earl of Dysart, KT, encircled with the collar of the Order of the Thistle

In 1743 he was made Knight of the Thistle. He was apparently very parsimonious towards his eldest son, who married Charlotte Walpole in 1760 without his father's knowledge.

== Memorials and succession ==
Grace, Lady Dysart, died at the Earl's new house in New Burlington Street, St James's. Dysart died in 1770, aged 72 and was buried in Helmingham. He was succeeded as earl by his eldest son, Lionel who erected no memorial to either parent and left no legitimate children. The title came for eight years to the next surviving son, Wilbraham who outlived his older, childless sister and then passed to the second of three surviving daughters who inherited the title after her brothers and died aged 95.

The funerary hatchments of the Earl and Countess are now in St Andrew's Church, Ham.

Peerage of Scotland
Preceded by Lionel Tollemache	Earl of Dysart; 1727–1770	Succeeded by Lionel Tollemache
