= Chilfrome Hoard =

Roman conquest coin hoard from Dorset, England (discovered 2021)

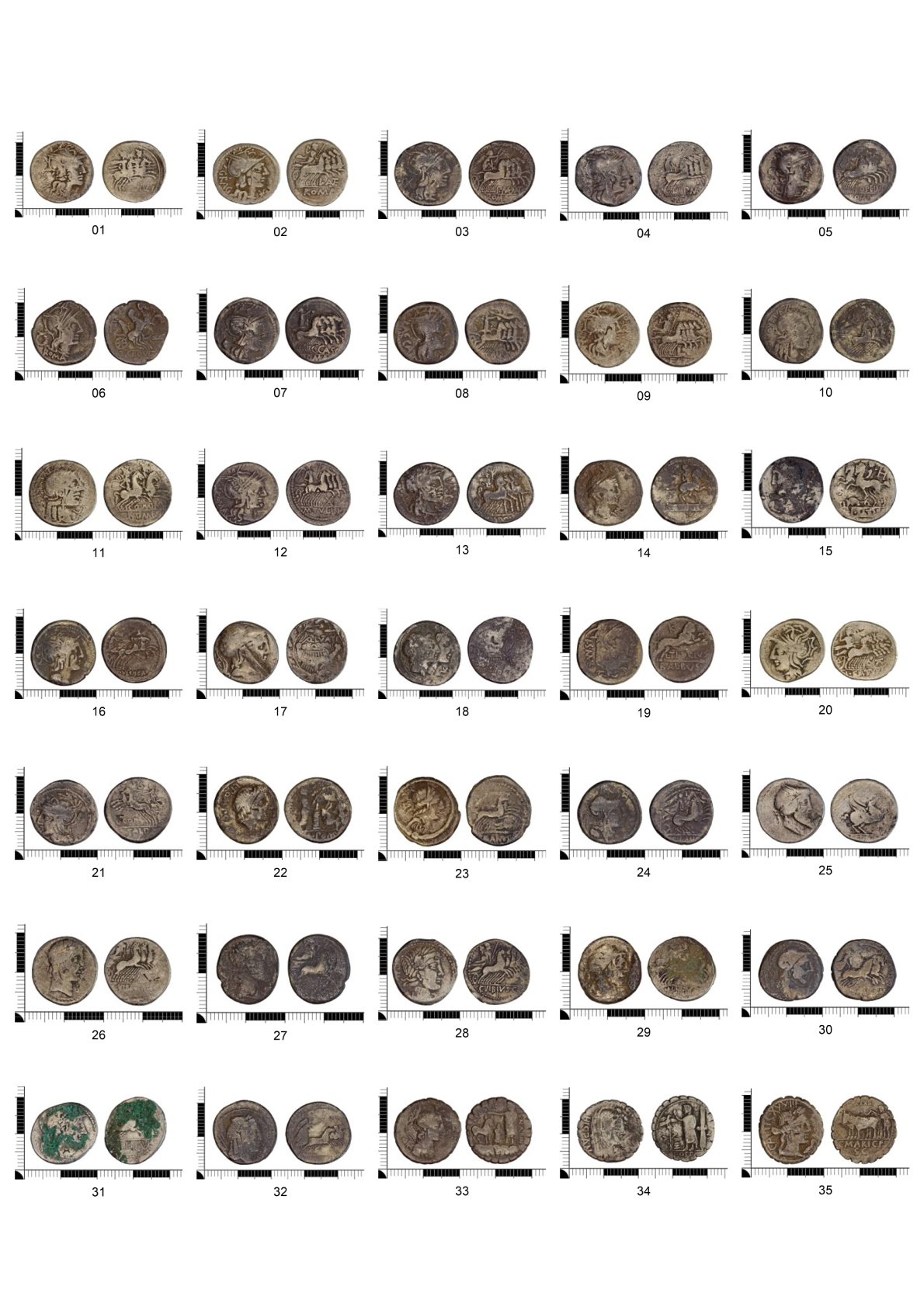
- Type: coin hoard
- Material: denarii
- Size: 97 denarii
- Created: 47 AD
- Discovered: Chilfrome, Dorset, England
- Discovered by: Trenton Oliver
- Registration: Portable Antiquities Scheme Treasure 2021T194
- Culture: Roman Britain
- https://finds.org.uk/database/artefacts/record/id/1025592

The Chilfrome Hoard is a Romano-British coin hoard dating to approximately 47 AD, in the village of Chilfrome, Dorset, England. Discovered in 2021 by metal detectorist Trenton Oliver, it is the only known "purely Roman hoard" dating to the Roman invasion of Southwest England. The hoard was declared as Treasure under the Portable Antiquities Scheme. The hoard was sold in 57 lots on 12^{th} November 2025 at Noonans Mayfair for a total hammer price of £16,625.

== Description ==
During the Roman conquest of Britain, helmed by Claudius. The Legio II Augusta, under command of Titus Flavius Vespasianus (later Emperor Vespasian) went through present day Richborough, Kent, and progressed west to Dorset, in the fight against the Durotriges.

The hoard was deposited in present day Chilfrome, between Maiden Castle and Waddon Hill (12-14 km away), close to a Roman road between Dorchester and the Mendip Hills, which became a major source of lead mining for the Romans. Based upon the composition of the hoard, a denarius of Claudius from 46-47 AD, was essential to the date of deposit, on top of the worn Roman Republican denarii which saw circulation for over 200 years.

The land around the hoard saw very little disturbance for the following millennia, until its discovery by metal detectorist Trenton Oliver on 21 March 2021, with no dispersal; subsequent excavations yielded no additional coins.

Evaluation was completed by the Dorset Museum, the Portable Antiquities Scheme (under ID: DOR-41B389) and the British Museum (2021 T194), before being declared treasure and set for a November 2025 auction by Noonans Mayfair, which estimates the value of the hoard at £6,500. It actually sold for a total of £16,625 with the highest price paid, £,200, for a denarius from the reign of Emperor Claudius.

It is believed to be the only hoard in Dorset to be composed of Roman coins (versus a mixed lot from Owermoigne). The absence of Celtic coinage indicates that it may be an official pay packet intended for the troops. It is contemporary to that of a hoard discovered in Suffolk in 2019, and the closest deposit is a larger cache of denarii found in Askerswell in 2018, which was deposited in 85 AD.

=== Composition ===
Reign and Administration	Quantity
Roman Republic	63
Mark Antony	1
Augustus	20
Tiberius	12
Claudius	1

The earliest coin in the hoard is a denarius issued in 141 BC, and the latest is a Claudian denarius from 46-47 AD. Other significant issues include minted pieces by Julius Caesar and an Augustan denarii depicting the appearance of Caesar's Comet (Roman Imperial Coinage 37a).

== See also ==
- List of Roman hoards in Great Britain
  - Worcestershire Conquest Hoard - Conquest-era hoard, discovered in 2023.
  - Bunnik Hoard - contemporary hoard of similar deposit (circa 47 AD), composition, discovered in the Netherlands in 2023.
  - Helmingham Hall Hoard - contemporary hoard of similar deposit (circa 47 AD), found in Suffolk from 2019 to 2021.
