= Lionel Tollemache, 3rd Earl of Dysart =

British politician and peer (1649–1727)

The Right Honourable The Earl of Dysart
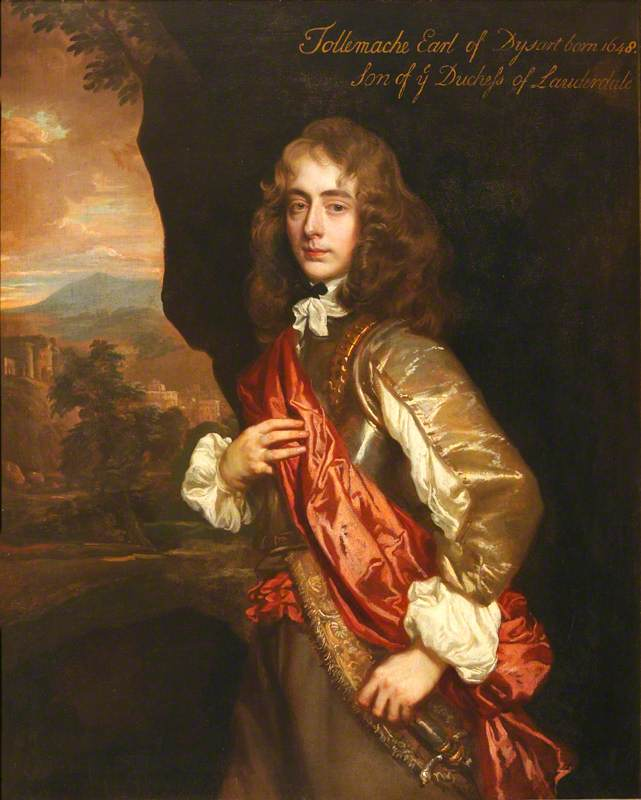
- An Unknown Gentleman, called Lionel Tollemache, 3rd Earl of Dysart (1649-1727), c. 1660, by Peter Lely

- Coat of arms: Arms of Tollemache: Argent a fret Sable
- Predecessor: Elizabeth, 2nd Countess of Dysart
- Successor: Lionel Tollemache, 4th Earl of Dysart
- Born: Lionel Tollemache; 30 January 1649; Helmingham Hall
- Died: 23 February 1727 (aged 78)
- Buried: St. Mary's Church, Helmingham, Suffolk; 52.1735°N 1.2024°E
- Noble family: Tollemache
- Spouse: Grace Wilbraham (m. 1680)
- Parents: Sir Lionel Tollemache, 3rd Baronet; Elizabeth, 2nd Countess of Dysart
- Occupation: Politician

Lionel Tollemache, 3rd Earl of Dysart (30 January 1649 – 23 February 1727), styled Lord Huntingtower from 1651 to 1698, was a British Tory politician and peer. A Member of Parliament at Westminster, he inherited Scottish peerages and was briefly Lord Lieutenant of Suffolk from 1703 to 1705.

== Biography ==
Dysart was born on 30 January 1649 at Helmingham Hall in Suffolk, the eldest son of Sir Lionel Tollemache, 3rd Baronet (died 1669), and Elizabeth, 2nd Countess of Dysart (died 1698). Educated at Queens' College, Cambridge, Lionel succeeded to his father's baronetcy on his death, and to some property in Suffolk, but also a raft of debts which bred in him a habit of frugality which was not shed in later years.

=== Political career ===
In 1673, Huntingtower contested Suffolk as a Tory; defeated by Sir Samuel Barnardiston, 1st Baronet, he had the return falsified by the sheriff, Sir William Soame, and took his seat in Parliament. An election committee declared Barnardiston elected, who initially obtained £1,000 damages from him in a suit before the King's Bench, but the decision was overturned by the Court of Exchequer Chamber. Tollemache was made a freeman of Eye in 1675. He briefly served as Member of Parliament for Orford in 1679 as a member of the Habeas Corpus Parliament. In 1685, he was again returned for that borough and was made portman of Orford, an office he held until about 1709.

Huntingtower went out of Parliament again upon the fall of James II in 1688. However, he was returned for Suffolk in 1698 and generally supported Tory principles. In that year, he succeeded his mother to become Earl of Dysart, making him a member of the Parliament of Scotland, but did not take his seat there. In 1702, he was appointed Vice-Admiral of Suffolk and became (until 1716) a freeman of Dunwich, and in 1703 was appointed Lord Lieutenant of Suffolk. He was also named High Steward of Ipswich that year, an office he held until his death. As Lord Lieutenant, he purged moderate Churchmen from lieutenancy offices. He was Mayor of Orford during the summer of 1704. His support for the "Tack" of the Occasional Conformity Bill led to his removal from his county offices in April 1705. Campaigning on the basis of his support for the Tack, he was returned for Suffolk again in 1705. As a Scottish peer, he was forced to leave the House of Commons by the Acts of Union 1707. He was offered a barony in the Peerage of Great Britain by Queen Anne upon her accession, but declined.

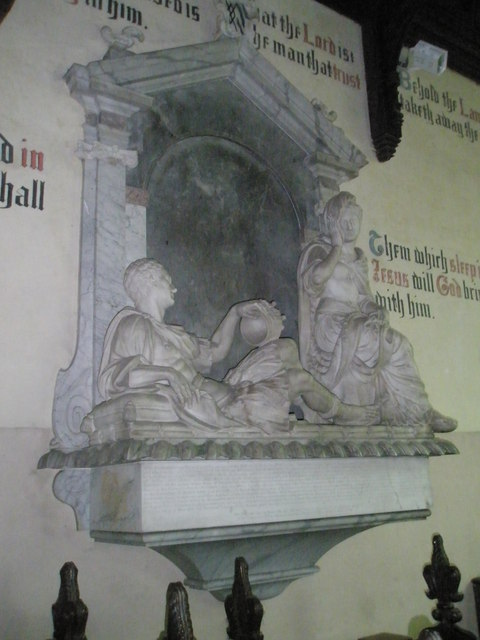
Monument to Lionel Tollemache, 3rd Earl of Dysart and his wife, St Mary's, Helmingham

Predeceased by his only son in 1712, Dysart remained a Tory and was considered a possible Jacobite, until his death. He died on 23 February 1727 and was buried at St Mary's, Helmingham. His male-line grandson Lionel inherited his titles.

=== Marriage and issue ===
On 30 September 1680, he married Grace Wilbraham, the daughter and coheir of Sir Thomas Wilbraham, 3rd Baronet. They had five children:

- Lionel Tollemache, Lord Huntingtower (1682– 26 July 1712), married, on 6 December 1706, Henrietta (d. 1718), illegitimate daughter of William Cavendish, 2nd Duke of Devonshire, and had issue:

- Lionel Tollemache, 4th Earl of Dysart
- Henrietta Tollemache

- Lady Elizabeth Tollemache (1682 – 6 August 1746), married Sir Robert Salusbury Cotton, 3rd Baronet
- Lady Catherine Tollemache (27 May 1685 – 17 January 1754), married John Brydges, Marquess of Carnarvon (15 Jan 1703 – 8 Apr 1727) on 1 September 1724
- Lady Mary Tollemache (27 May 1685 – 2 December 1715)
- Lady Grace Tollemache (d. 27 May 1719)

Parliament of England
Preceded by Walter Devereux; Allen Brodrick	Member of Parliament for Orford; 1679; With: Sir John Duke, Bt 1679	Succeeded by Sir John Duke, Bt; Henry Parker
Preceded by Sir John Duke, Bt; Thomas Glemham	Member of Parliament for Orford; 1685–1689; With: Thomas Glemham	Succeeded by Thomas Glemham; Sir John Duke, Bt
Preceded by Sir Gervase Elwes, Bt; Sir Samuel Barnardiston, Bt	Member of Parliament for Suffolk; 1698–1707; With: Sir Samuel Barnardiston, Bt 1698–1702; Sir Dudley Cullum, Bt 1702–1705; Sir Robert Davers, Bt 1705–1707	Succeeded by Sir Robert Davers, Bt; Leicester Martin
Honorary titles
Preceded by Sir Charles Rich, Bt	Vice-Admiral of Suffolk; 1702–1705	Succeeded by The Duke of Grafton
Preceded by The Lord Cornwallis	Lord Lieutenant of Suffolk; 1703–1705	Succeeded by The Duke of Grafton
Peerage of Scotland
Preceded by Elizabeth Maitland	Earl of Dysart; 1698–1727	Succeeded by Lionel Tollemache
Baronetage of England
Preceded by Lionel Tollemache	Baronet (of Helmingham Hall); 1669–1727	Succeeded by Lionel Tollemache
