= Peyton baronets of Isleham (1611) =

Escutcheon of the Peyton baronets of Isleham

The Peyton baronetcy, of Isleham in the County of Cambridge, was created in the Baronetage of England on 22 May 1611 for John Peyton, son of Robert Peyton MP (died 1590) and his wife Elizabeth Rich, daughter of Richard Rich, 1st Baron Rich. He served as Member of Parliament for Cambridgeshire, in 1593 and again in 1604.

The 2nd Baronet also served as Member of Parliament for Cambridgeshire, during the 1620s. The baronetcy became extinct in 1815 on the death of the 8th Baronet.

== Peyton baronets, of Isleham (1611) ==
- Sir John Peyton, 1st Baronet (1560–1616)
- Sir Edward Peyton, 2nd Baronet (died 1657)
- Sir John Peyton, 3rd Baronet (1607–1666)
- Sir John Peyton, 4th Baronet (died 1721)
- Sir Yelverton Peyton, 5th Baronet (died 1748)
- Sir Charles Peyton, 6th Baronet (died 1760)
- Sir John Peyton, 7th Baronet (died 1772)
- Sir Yelverton Peyton, 8th Baronet (1739–1815)

Cokayne comments that the succession to the 4th Baronet was questionable, but was accepted at the time.

== Notes ==
Baronetage of England
| Preceded by Booth baronets | Peyton baronets of Isleham; 22 May 1611 | Succeeded by Tollemache baronets |
