= A Boat Passing a Lock =

Painting by John Constable

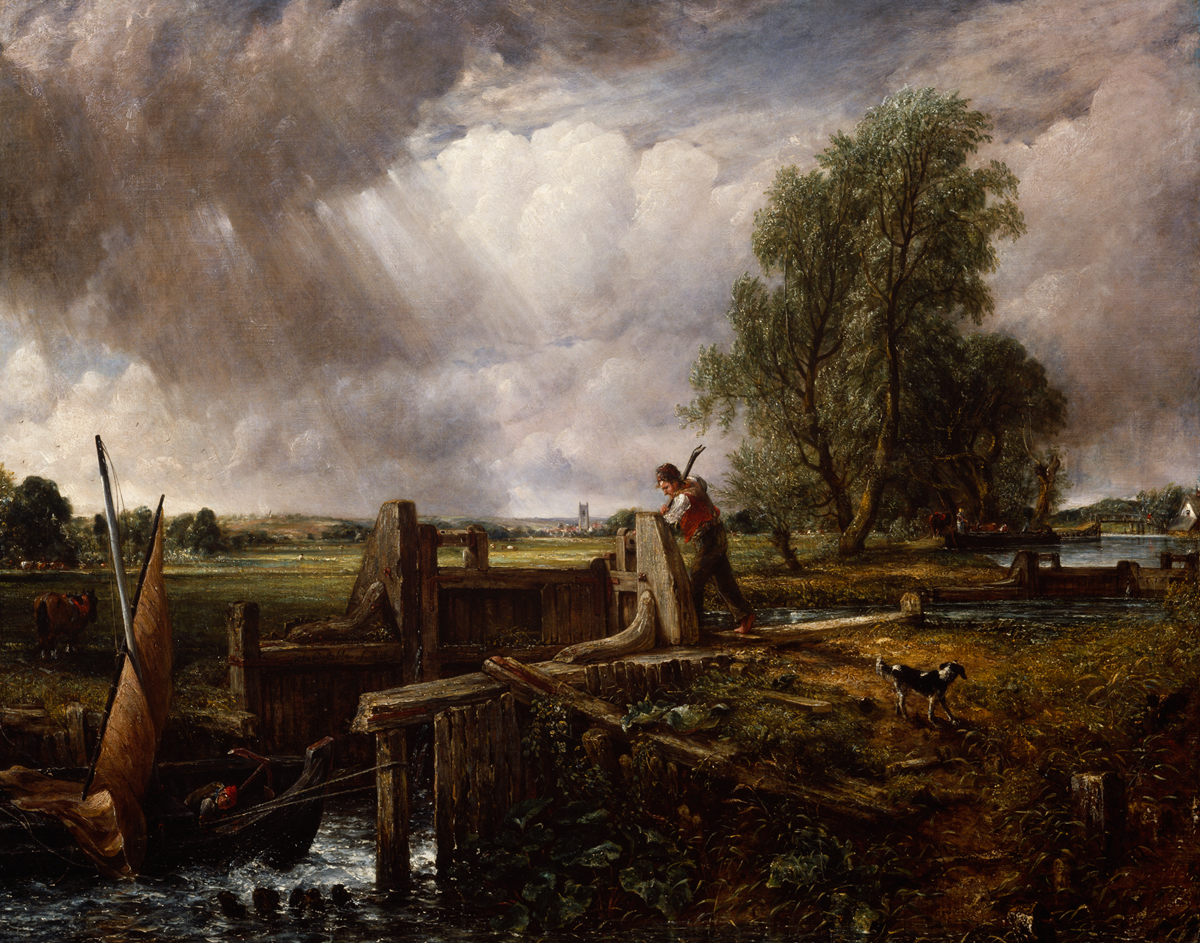
- Artist: John Constable
- Year: 1826
- Type: Oil on canvas, landscape painting
- Dimensions: 101.6 cm × 127 cm (40.0 in × 50 in)
- Location: Royal Academy; London

A Boat Passing a Lock is an 1826 landscape painting by the British artist John Constable. It portrays a scene at Flatford Lock on the River Stour in Suffolk, an area now known as "Constable Country". A brooding, stormy sky is a prominent feature as a boat approaches the lock. The tower of Dedham Church can be seen in the distance, while Flatford Old Bridge is on the far right. It borrows from the composition of his earlier painting The Lock, but switches from a portrait to a landscape format and alters some of the action. In 1829 when Constable was elected to full membership of the Royal Academy of Arts he submitted this as his diploma work. By then it was in the ownership of the bookseller James Carpenter, with Constable taking it back in exchange for the promise of another painting Helmingham Dell. The original remains in the possession of the Royal Academy. A study for the work is now in the collection of the National Gallery of Victoria.

== See also ==
- List of paintings by John Constable

== Bibliography ==
- Fenton, James. School of Genius: A History of the Royal Academy of Arts. Harry N. Abrams, 2006.
- Reynolds, Graham. Constable's England. Metropolitan Museum of Art, 1983.
- Thornes, John E. John Constable's Skies: A Fusion of Art and Science. A&C Black, 1999.
