= Chilfrome =

Village in Dorset, England

Coordinates: 50.7878°N 2.5862°W

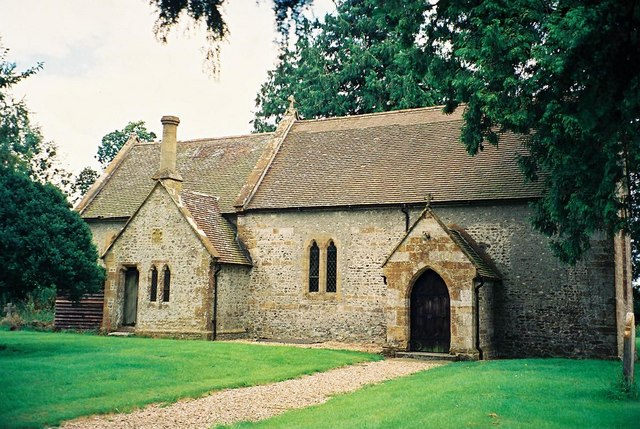
- Parish church of the Holy Trinity

- Location within Dorset
- Population: 40
- OS grid reference: SY587988
- Unitary authority: Dorset
- Ceremonial county: Dorset
- Region: South West
- Country: England
- Sovereign state: United Kingdom
- Post town: Dorchester
- Postcode district: DT2
- Dialling code: 01300
- Police: Dorset
- Fire: Dorset and Wiltshire
- Ambulance: South Western

Chilfrome (/ˈtʃɪlˌfruːm/) is a small village and civil parish in the county of Dorset in southwest England. It lies in the Dorset unitary authority administrative area, approximately 9 miles (14 km) northwest of the county town Dorchester. It is situated between the villages of Cattistock and Maiden Newton in the upper reaches of the Frome Valley in the Dorset Downs. Dorset County Council estimate that in 2013 the population of the civil parish was 40.

The region served as a passing point by the Legio II Augusta during the Roman conquest of Britain. The Chilfrome Hoard was deposited in the town circa 47 AD, and was rediscovered by metal detectorists in 2021.

The parish church dates from the 14th century and is a Grade II* Listed Building. It was largely restored in 1864, though it has a thirteenth-century chancel-arch, a partly fourteenth-century nave, and windows dating from the fifteenth century.

Three long-distance footpaths, the Wessex Ridgeway, the Macmillan Way and the Frome Valley Trail, all pass through the village.
