= William Glover (MP) =

English politician

William Glover (1559–1629) was an English politician who sat in the House of Commons in 1624.

Glover was the son of John Glover. In 1624, he was elected Member of Parliament for Orford for the Happy Parliament.

Parliament of England
Preceded by Sir Lionel Tollemache; Sir Roger Townshend	Member of Parliament for Orford; 1624; With: Sir Robert Hitcham	Succeeded by Sir Robert Hitcham; Sir William Whitepole
