= Wilbraham Tollemache, 6th Earl of Dysart =

British military officer, politician and peer (1739–1821)

The Right Honourable The Earl of Dysart
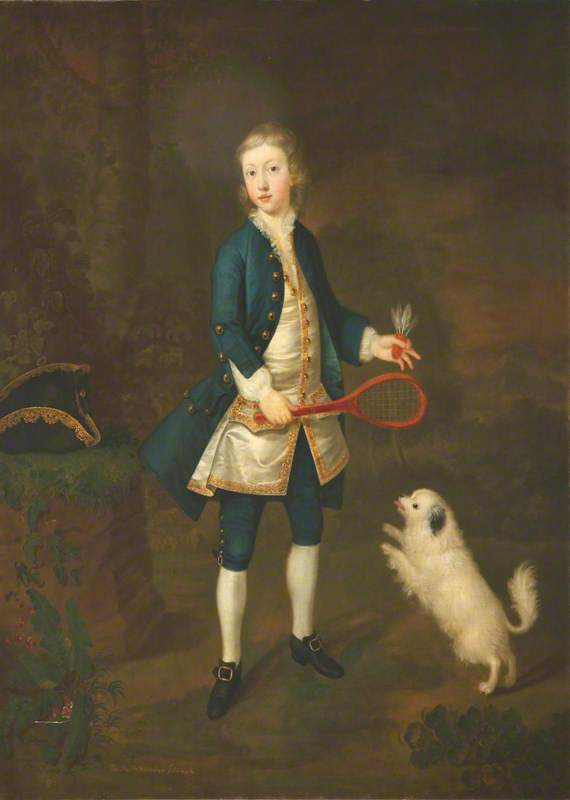
- Born: 21 October 1739; England
- Died: 9 March 1821 (aged 81); Ham House, London
- Occupations: MP for Northampton & Liskeard; High Sheriff of Cheshire & High Steward of Ipswich
- Spouse: Anna Maria Lewis
- Parents: Lionel Tollemache, 4th Earl of Dysart (father); Grace Carteret (mother)

Wilbraham Tollemache, 6th Earl of Dysart, FRS (21 October 1739 – 9 March 1821) was a British military officer, politician and peer who sat in the House of Commons from 1771 to 1784.

== Biography ==
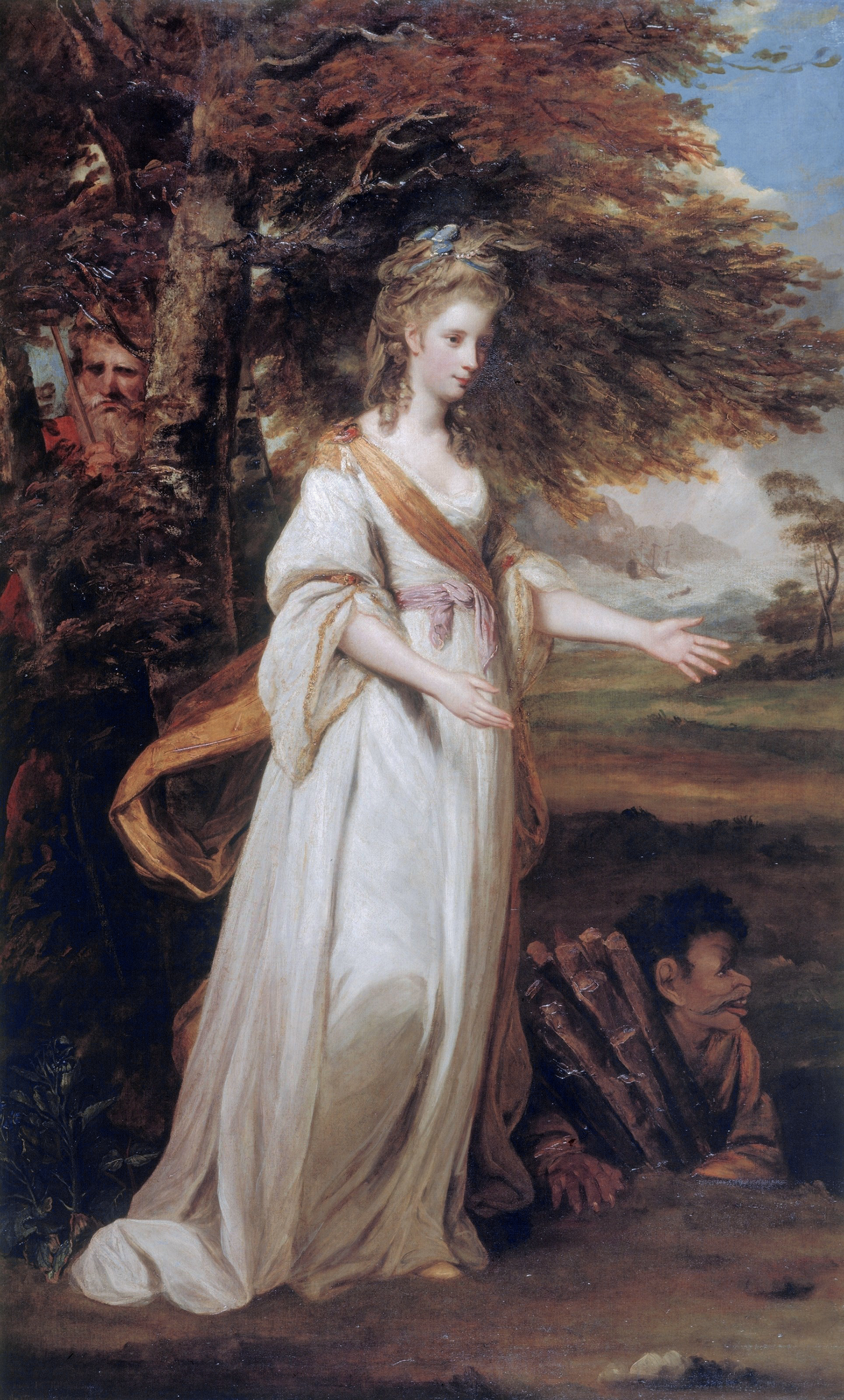
Anna Maria Tollemache (by Joshua Reynolds, 1773–1774)

Tollemache was a younger son of Lionel Tollemache, 4th Earl of Dysart. He originally served in the Royal Navy, and then in the British Army, retiring in 1775 as a major in the 6th Regiment of Foot. He first entered the House of Commons as Member of Parliament for Northampton in 1771. On 4 February 1773, he married Anna Maria Lewis, but had no children. He continued to sit for Northampton until 1780, and then represented Liskeard until 1784. He was High Sheriff of Cheshire in 1785, and later High Steward of Ipswich, like his elder brother.

He inherited the earldom and the accompanying estates from his childless elder brother, Lionel, at the age of sixty in 1799. One of his first acts was to purchase the manor of Canbury from George Hardinge, bringing the area back into the family. Wilbraham carried out a programme of improvements at Ham House, including the creation of the Yellow Satin Bedroom, demolishing part of the northern wall and opening the view of the house to the river, relocating the busts of Roman Emperors to niches in the house wall, creating the ha-has and the addition of the Coade stone statues. Wilbraham was a collector of art and was an early patron of John Constable. Tollemache was also a patron of Reynolds and Gainsborough. The historian Evelyn Pritctard describes him as "a different character from the three previous earls – cultivated, humane, generous, with polished manners, treating his dependents and servants extremely well".

Dysart died without children. All five sons of the 4th Earl were dead, and there were no grandsons. The Tollemache baronetcy, therefore, became extinct, while the Earldom of Dysart passed to his sister Lady Louisa Manners. The estates were divided between Louisa and her younger sister, Lady Jane Halliday, with Jane receiving Helmingham, Suffolk, Cheshire and Northants, whilst Louisa inherited Ham House and the surrounding estates in Ham, Petersham and Canbury. Both families took the name of Tollemache.

== Sources ==
Attribution

Parliament of Great Britain
Preceded by Sir George Brydges Rodney; Thomas Howe	Member of Parliament for Northampton with Sir George Brydges Rodney 1771–1774; Sir George Robinson, Bt 1774–1780; 1771–1780	Succeeded by Viscount Althorp; George Rodney
Preceded by Samuel Salt; Edward Gibbon	Member of Parliament for Liskeard with Samuel Salt; 1780–1784	Succeeded by Edward James Eliot; John Eliot
Honorary titles
Preceded by Thomas Willis	High Sheriff of Cheshire; 1785	Succeeded by Henry Cornwall Legh
Peerage of Scotland
Preceded by Lionel Tollemache	Earl of Dysart; 1799–1821	Succeeded by Louisa Tollemache
Baronetage of England
Preceded by Lionel Tollemache	Baronet (of Helmingham); 1799–1821	Extinct
