= Sir Lionel Tollemache, 3rd Baronet =

English Baronet

Sir Lionel Tollemache
- 3rd Baronet of Helmingham

- Coat of arms: Arms of Tollemache: Argent a fret Sable
- Successor: Lionel Tollemache, 3rd Earl of Dysart
- Born: 1624; Helmingham Hall
- Baptised: 25 April 1624; Helmingham
- Died: 1669 (aged 44–45)
- Buried: 25 March 1669
- Noble family: Tollemache
- Spouse: Elizabeth Murray
- Issue: Lionel; Thomas; William; Elizabeth; Catherine
- Father: Sir Lionel Tollemache, 2nd Baronet
- Mother: Elizabeth Stanhope

Sir Lionel Tollemache, 3rd Baronet (1624–1669) of Helmingham Hall in Suffolk, was the head of a prominent East Anglian family. He was the son of Sir Lionel Tollemache, 2nd Baronet and Elizabeth Stanhope, daughter and heiress of John Stanhope, 1st Baron Stanhope of Harrington.

== Family ==
Around 1648, Tollemache married Elizabeth Murray, a daughter and co-heiress of William Murray, 1st Earl of Dysart, 'whipping boy' to King Charles I.

He and his wife, who were both fervent royalists, moved to her seat at Ham House in Surrey, which in due course became a centre for the activities of the Sealed Knot. Together they were in contact with Charles Stuart, later Charles II, then in exile on the continent. Rather surprisingly, however, Elizabeth was also said to be on very good terms with the Lord Protector, Oliver Cromwell, leading to claims that he was the real father of some of her children, since discounted.

Tollemache appears to have been plagued with ill health throughout much of his life. Augustus Hare, in The Story of My Life (1900) suggested that this was as a result of his being slowly poisoned by his wife, who had used up his fortune turning Ham House into a grand palace and now needed new sources of income with which to pay off her creditors. There is no evidence to back up such a claim however and it must be seen that Elizabeth's reputation has suffered from its subsequent association with that of her second husband, John Maitland, 1st Duke of Lauderdale, whom it was said she charmed even as her husband's health deteriorated. Tollemache travelled to France in search of cures for his debilitating sickness, but died in Paris. In 1670 Elizabeth obtained confirmation from King Charles that she could pass on the title of Earl of Dysart to any one of her children.

== Family and Issue ==
Sir Lionel and Lady Dysart had eleven children, five of whom survived to adulthood:

- Lionel Tollemache, 3rd Earl of Dysart, his eldest son, inherited the Earldom of Dysart on his mother's death in 1698.
- Elizabeth Tollemache (1659–1735) married Archibald Campbell, 1st Duke of Argyll.
- Catherine Tollemache married James Stewart, Lord Doune and secondly John Gordon, 16th Earl of Sutherland.
- Thomas Tollemache, Lieutenant-General, abandoned the family's devotion to the House of Stuart and became a key supporter of William of Orange (later King William III of England).
- William Tollemache (1661–1694) was a captain in the Royal Navy.

== Notes ==
Baronetage of England
Preceded by Lionel Tollemache	Baronet (of Helmingham Hall); 1640–1669	Succeeded by Lionel Tollemache
