= Worcestershire Conquest Hoard =

British Roman Hoard from Worcestershire during reign of Nero

- Material: 1368 Iron Age and Roman gold and silver coins, including an Iron Age stater and Roman denarii
- Created: 55 CE
- Period/culture: Reign of Nero (AD 54–68)
- Discovered: 2023; Worcestershire
- Culture: Roman Britain

The Worcestershire Conquest Hoard is a Romano-British coin hoard dating to the reign of Nero (AD 54–68). The hoard was found during construction work in Leigh and Bransford, Worcestershire, England, and was hidden inside a clay jar. Valued at minimum of £100,000, there has been a crowdfunding effort since December 2024 to acquire the hoard for Museums Worcestershire, led by the Worcestershire Heritage, Art & Museums Charity.

== Background ==
Following the Claudian invasion in AD 43, the Roman Empire expanded its reach into northern and western Britain, conquering and pacifying the native tribes and kingdoms of Iron Age Britain. Numerous coin hoards were buried during this period, including the Hallaton hoard, the Helmingham Hall hoard, and the Nunney hoard. These finds are often interpreted as the savings of legionaries or wealthy natives, hidden in response to, or anticipation of, violence and conflict.

The hoard was found in 2023 during construction work in Leigh and Bransford, a rural community near Worcester. It was declared as Treasure by HM Coroner in June 2024. Described as the most important archaeological find in the county in the last century, a fundraising campaign was launched in December 2024 by the Worcestershire Heritage, Art & Museums Charity, which hopes to acquire the hoard for the permanent collection of Museums Worcestershire. As of January 2025, the value of the hoard had not been fully determined, but has been suggested to be worth upwards of £100,000.

Since 11 January 2025 the hoard has been on display at the Worcester City Museum and Art Gallery.

== Contents ==
The hoard consists of 1368 gold and silver coins dated to the Iron Age and Romano-British periods. The earliest coin in the hoard is a silver Roman Republican denarius minted in 157 BC, while the latest is an early imperial denarius of Nero minted in AD 55. One of the coins is a gold stater, minted during the reign of the Dobunnic ruler Eisu in circa AD 20–45. The hoard also contains a silver denarius of Juba I of Numidia, minted in Utica in 60-46 BC.

Many of the denarii in the hoard exhibit bankers' marks, whose purpose is unclear.

The hoard was hidden in a ceramic jar, which had been shattered in the ground by a plough. The jar was identified as a type of Roman pottery known as Severn Valley ware, which was produced at a number of kiln sites located between Wroxeter in the north and Gloucester in the south. It has been suggested that the hoard pot was probably manufactured near Malvern Link, where numerous Severn Valley ware kilns have been recorded during archaeological excavations.

As of 2025, the hoard has distinction of being the largest hoard from the time of the Roman Conquest (AD 43–84) ever found in Britain, and one of the largest hoards of the reign of Nero ever found within the Roman Empire. Its burial has been associated with Roman military activity in the West Midlands and Welsh Borders, which was at its peak between the war with Caratacus and the Boudican Rebellion. It is believed that the hoard is the savings of a local farmer who supplied the Roman military with provisions.

== See also ==
- List of hoards in Great Britain
- Bunnik Hoard - a contemporary hoard of similar composition, discovered 2023 in Bunnik, Netherlands
