= High Steward of Ipswich =

This is a list of people who have served as High Steward of Ipswich in Suffolk.

- 1557-1580: Sir William Cordell
- 1581-1590: Sir Francis Walsingham
- 1590-1596: Henry Carey, 1st Baron Hunsdon
- 1596-1600: Robert Devereux, 2nd Earl of Essex
- 1600-1608: Thomas Sackville, 1st Baron Buckhurst
- 1609-1626: Thomas Howard, 1st Earl of Suffolk
- 1627-1640: Theophilus Howard, 2nd Earl of Suffolk
- 1653-1688: James Howard, 3rd Earl of Suffolk
- 1692-1698: Charles Cornwallis, 3rd Baron Cornwallis
- 1703-1727: Lionel Tollemache, 3rd Earl of Dysart
- 1800-1805: Horatio Nelson, 1st Viscount Nelson
- 1806-1821: Wilbraham Tollemache, 6th Earl of Dysart.
- 1821-1848: Sir Robert Harland, 2nd Baronet
- 1849-1874: Charles Austin
- 1875-1882: John Chevallier Cobbold
- 1882-1884: Sir Richard Wallace, 1st Baronet
- 1884-1909: Peter Burrell, 4th Baron Gwydyr
- 1909-1916: Horatio Kitchener, 1st Viscount Kitchener of Khartoum
- 1916-1932: Sir Edward Packard
- 1932-1949: Arthur Churchman, 1st Baron Woodbridge
- 1950-1964: Bertram Gurdon, 2nd Baron Cranworth
- 1967-1988: Sir Frank Trowbridge Mason
- 1990-present: Stuart Leonard Whiteley
