= Sir Lionel Tollemache, 1st Baronet =

Lionel Tollemache
- 1st Baronet of Helmingham
- Arms of Tollemache: Argent, a fret sable
- Successor: Sir Lionel Tollemache, 2nd Baronet
- Born: 1562; England
- Baptised: 14 December 1562; Helmingham, England
- Died: 1612 (aged 49–50)
- Buried: St. Mary's Church, Helmingham, Suffolk; 52.1735°N 1.2024°E
- Noble family: Tollemache
- Spouse: Catherine Cromwell (m. 1581)
- Issue: Sir Lionel Tollemache, 2nd Baronet; Robert Tollemache; Edward Tollemache; Susan Tollemache; Mary Tollemache; Katherine Tollemache; Anne Tollemache
- Father: Lionel Tollemache
- Mother: Susanna Jermyn

Sir Lionel Tollemache, 1st Baronet (1562 – 1612), the son of Lionel Tollemache of Helmingham, Suffolk and Susanna Jermyn, served twice as Sheriff of Suffolk, in 1593 and 1609, and was knighted in 1612.

== Biography ==
He was the only son and heir of Lionel Tollemache (1545 – 11 Dec 1575) of Helmingham, and Susanna, daughter of Sir Ambrose Jermyn of Rushbrooke in Suffolk. He was baptised on 14 December 1562 at Helmingham.

He was Sheriff of Suffolk in 1593, again in 1609, and was amongst the first batch of baronets created on the institution of the order by James I in 1611. On 22 May 1611 he was created a baronet of Helmingham, and was subsequently knighted at the Palace of Whitehall on 24 May 1612.

== Marriage and children ==
On 10 February 1581 at North Elmham, he married Catherine (d.1621), daughter of Henry Cromwell, 2nd Baron Cromwell and Mary, daughter of John Paulet, 2nd Marquess of Winchester, by whom he had several children, including:

- Sir Lionel Tollemache, 2nd Baronet (1591–1640), son and heir.
- Robert Tollemache (born 1592) married Dorothy, daughter of John Lane in Staffordshire.
- Edward Tollemache (baptised 20 June 1596)
- Susan Tollemache married Sir Henry Doily of Shottisham.
- Mary Tollemache
- Katherine Tollemache
- Anne Tollemache, married Robert Gosnold (V)

== Death ==
He died in 1612 and was buried at Helmingham, "his effigy, in richly gilt armour, being placed by itself on the great tomb in the church there".
Above the kneeling figure of Sir Lionel are the Tollemache arms, with the arms of Cromwell, and beneath the lines:

Here with his Fathers sleeps Sr Lyonell
Knight Barronet all Honors worthy well
So well ye acts of all his life exprest
His elders vertues and excel'd their beste
His prudent bearing in his publique place
Suff. high Shireve twice in 16 yeeres space.
His Zeale to God and towards ill seventie
His temperance his Justice his sinceritie
His native mildnesse towards great and small
His Faith and Love to Frends wife children all
In life and death made him belov'd and deere
To God and men. Happy in heaven and heere.
Happy in soule in body goods and name
Happy in wedlock with a noble Dame
Lord Cromwells Daughter happie in his heire
Whose spring of vertues sprouts so yong, so faire
Whos deere affection to his Founders' debtor
Built them this toomb, but in his hart a better.

His widow, who outlived him by eight years, died on 24 March 1621 and was buried at Helmingham, where there is a marble tablet over the chancel door of the church erected to her memory.

== Notes ==
Baronetage of England
New creation	Baronet (of Helmingham Hall); 1611–1612	Succeeded by Lionel Tollemache
