= Lionel Tollemache, 5th Earl of Dysart =

English peer (1734–1799)

The Right Honourable The Earl of Dysart
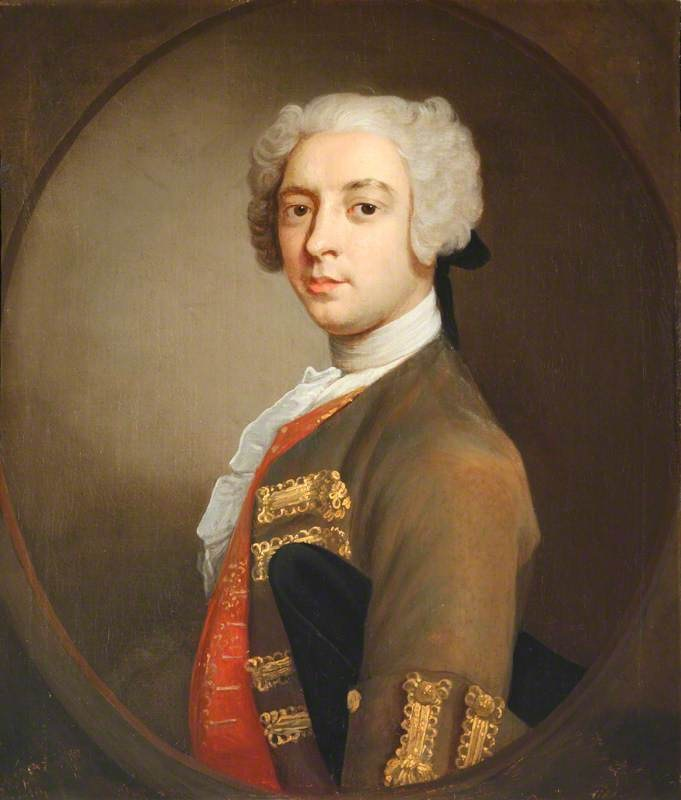
- Lionel Tollemache (1734–1799), 5th Earl of Dysart, c.1750, British (English) School
- Born: 6 August 1734; England
- Died: 20 February 1799 (aged 64); England
- Spouses: Charlotte Walpole; Magdalene Lewis
- Parent(s): Lionel Tollemache, 4th Earl of Dysart; Grace Carteret

Lionel Tollemache, 5th Earl of Dysart (6 August 1734 – 20 February 1799), styled Lord Huntingtower until 1770, was an English peer.

Lord Huntingtower received no settlement from his father at his majority, and, feeling he owed him nothing, married without his knowledge or consent. The bride was Charlotte, daughter of Sir Edward Walpole, whom he married on 2 October 1760 at St James's Church, Piccadilly. Charlotte's uncle Horace Walpole called Huntingtower "a very handsome person". He succeeded to the earldom a decade later.

Charlotte died, after a long and painful illness, at Ham House on 5 September 1789. Dysart remarried, on 19 April 1791, to Magdalene Lewis, sister of his brother Wilbraham's wife. He had no children by either wife, and upon his death at Ham House in 1799 was succeeded by his brother Wilbraham.

Peerage of Scotland
Preceded by Lionel Tollemache	Earl of Dysart; 1770–1799	Succeeded by Wilbraham Tollemache
