= Colchester and Ipswich Museums Service =

Colchester and Ipswich Museums Service (CIMS) was established in 2007 to provide joint services to the residents of Ipswich and Colchester. Colchester Borough Council was the designated lead authority.

CIMS runs seven venues:

== Resource Centre ==
The CIMS Resource Centre is based in Colchester. Over 100 artworks are kept here.

== Colchester heritage venues ==
- Colchester Castle, in Castle Park
- Hollytrees Museum, in Castle Park
- Colchester Natural History Museum, High Street

== Ipswich heritage venues ==
CIMS manages three properties belonging to Ipswich Borough Council

- Christchurch Mansion
- Ipswich Art Gallery
- Ipswich Museum
