= William Arthur Shaw =

English historian (1865–1943)

William Arthur Shaw FBA
- Born: 19 April 1865; Ashton-under-Lyne, England
- Died: 15 April 1943 (aged 77); Enfield, Middlesex, England

Academic background
- Education: Owens College

William Arthur Shaw FBA (1865–1943) was an English historian and archivist.

== Life ==
Born on 19 April 1865, in Hooley Hill, Ashton-under-Lyne, now in Greater Manchester, he was the son of James Shaw and his wife Sarah Ann Hampshire. He graduated B.A. at Owens College in 1883.

Shaw worked for the Chetham Society, and then the Public Record Office, as an editor. In 1940 he was elected a Fellow of the British Academy. He died at Chase Farm Hospital in Enfield, Middlesex, on 15 April 1943.

The majority of his later life was devoted to the calendaring of Treasury records of the later Stuart and early Georgian period, between 1660 and 1745. These were published with extensive introductions, charting his view of the development of the national financial administration and other topics, and often challenging the received wisdom. F.H. Slingsby, who brought Shaw's posthumous final volumes to press, considered that the "animosities" expressed in some of these introductions were "usually well founded"; although P.G.M. Dickson considered that "Shaw's views were curiously vehement and often based on inaccurate data, and must be treated with caution."

In particular, Shaw's summary tables of revenue and expenditure have been found to be incorrect, failing to take into account some of the intricate accounting devices of the time, leading him to incorrect conclusions.

Shaw also wrote a substantial number of entries for the Dictionary of National Biography.

== Works ==
- Shaw WA, ed. (1897–1903). Calendar of Treasury Books and Papers. London: HMSO. 5 vols, covering 1729–1745.
- Shaw WA, ed. (1904–1961). Calendar of Treasury Books. London: HMSO. 32 vols, covering 1660–1718. Volumes 20 et seq published posthumously.
- Shaw WA (1894). Manchester Old and New. London: Cassell and Co. 3 vols: vol 1; vol 2, vol 3
- Shaw WA (1895). The History of Currency, 1252 to 1894: Being an Account of the Gold and Silver Monies and Monetary Standards of Europe and America, Etc. Wilsons & Company. 1 vol
- Shaw WA (1900). A history of the English Church during the civil wars and under the Commonwealth, 1640–1660. London: Longmans, Green, and Co. 2 vols: vol 1; vol 2
- Shaw WA (1906). The Knights of England. London: Sherratt and Hughes. 2 vols: vol 1; vol 2
