= Helmingham Hall =

House in Helmingham, Suffolk, UK

Coordinates: 52.17154°N 1.19537°E

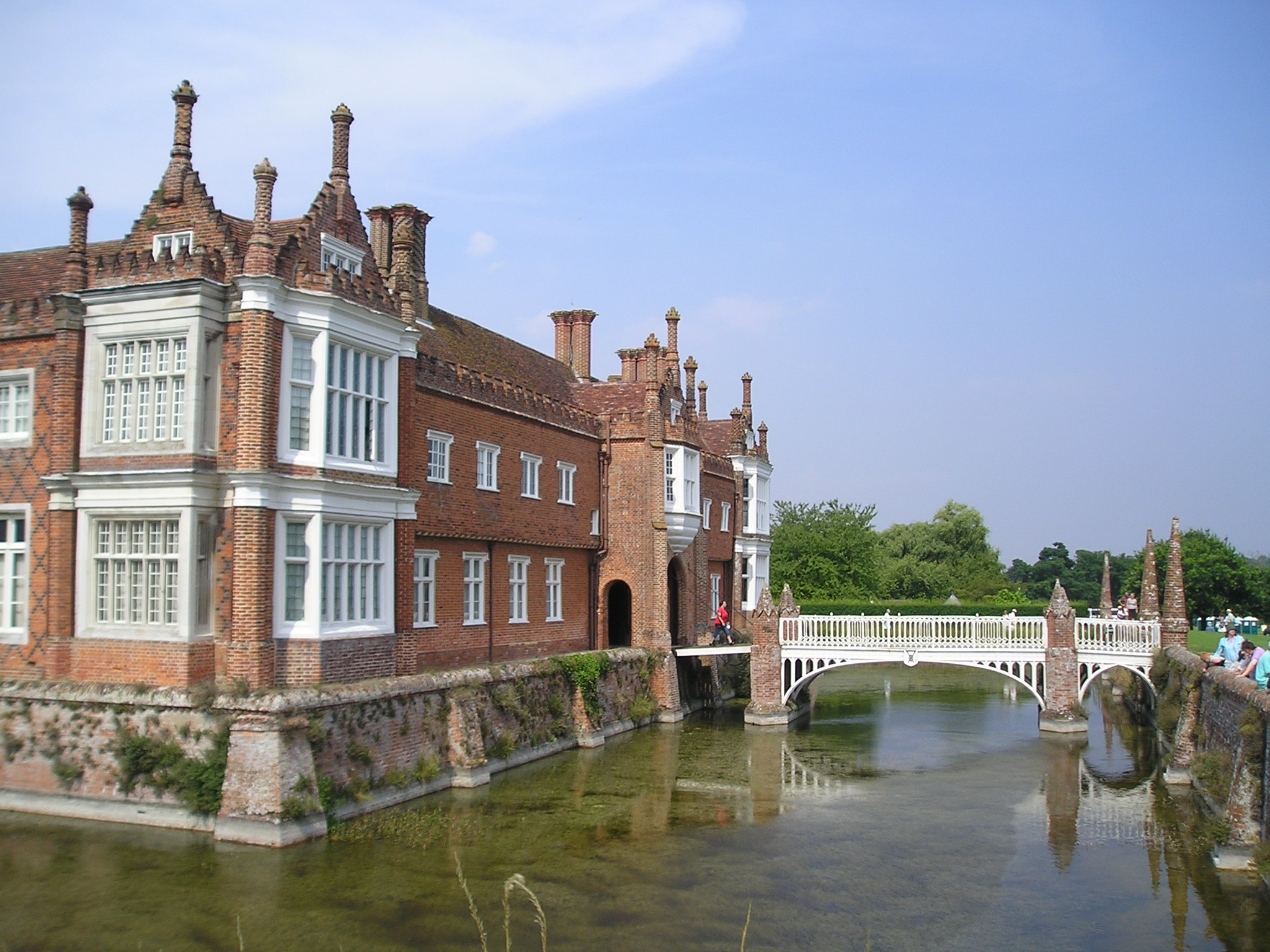
Helmingham Hall, showing its 60-foot wide moat and drawbridge (left, without railings)

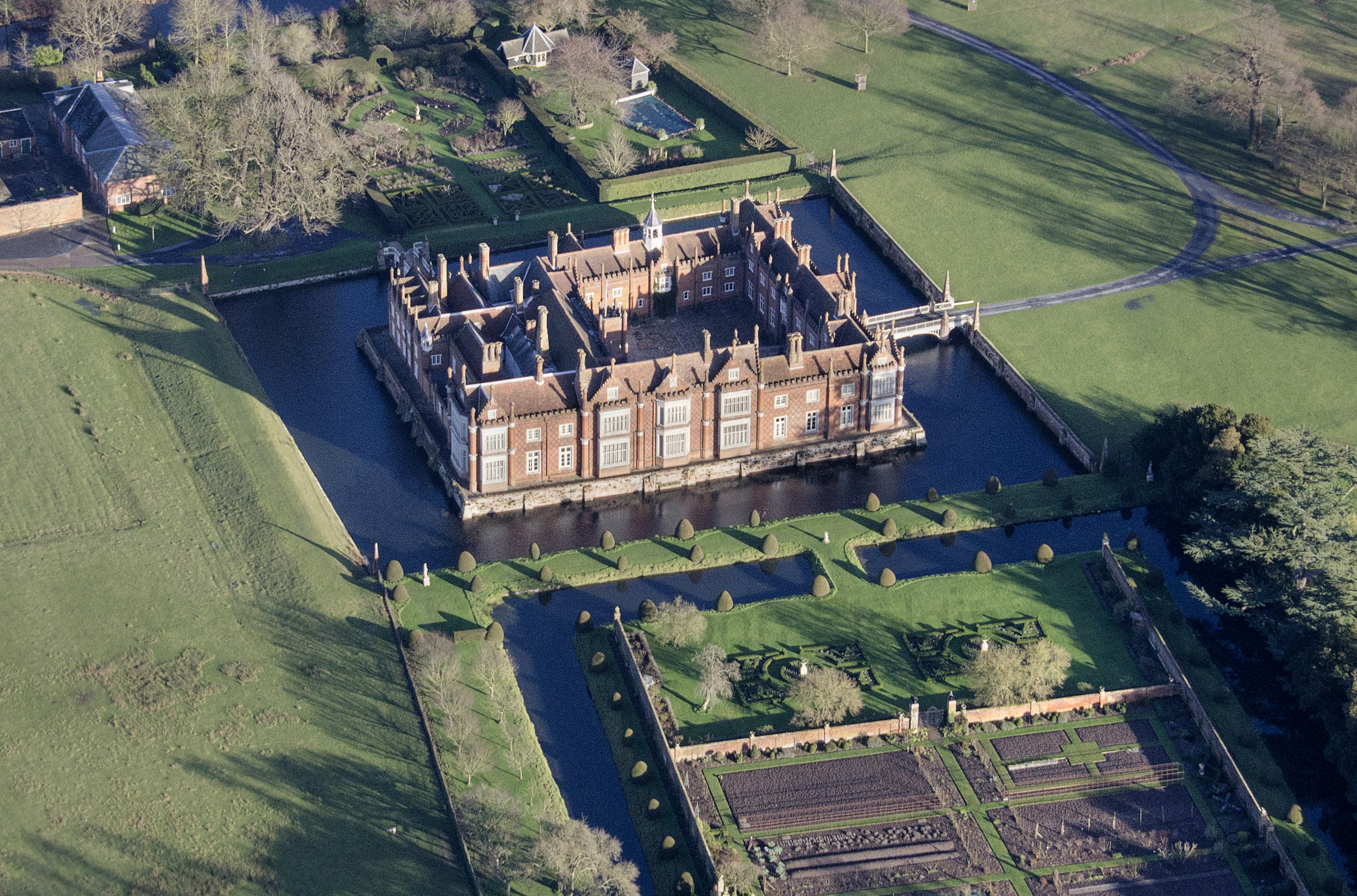
Aerial view showing some of the gardens and park

Helmingham Hall is a moated manor house in Helmingham, Suffolk, England. It was begun by John Tollemache in 1480 and has been owned by the Tollemache family ever since. The house is built around a courtyard in typical late medieval/Tudor style. The house is listed Grade I on the National Heritage List for England, and its park and formal gardens are also Grade I listed on the Register of Historic Parks and Gardens.

== History ==
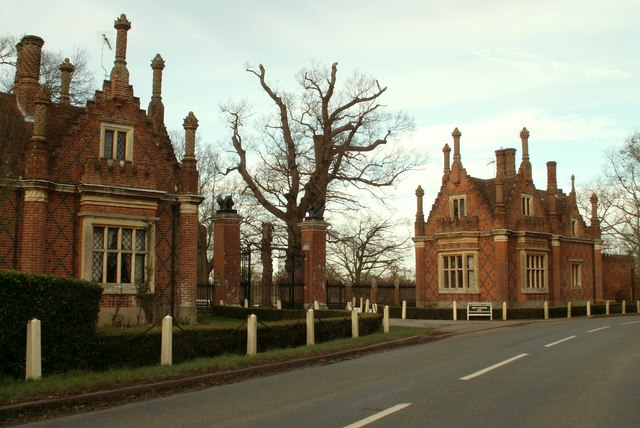
Park Gate Lodges at Helmingham Hall

The present Helmingham Hall may have been initially constructed in 1510 on the site of an earlier house called Creke Hall. The exterior was altered between 1745 and 1760, again in 1800 by John Nash, and in 1840. The original half-timbered walls have been concealed by brick and tiles. The house is surrounded by a moat 60 feet wide, over which it is reached only by two working drawbridges, which have been pulled up every night since 1510. These were originally operated with a windlass but in recent years this has been replaced by an electric motor.

In addition to the house and gardens, several other buildings and structures on the estate are listed Grade II. The garden wall to the south west of the hall, two urns and a male and female statue, a sundial and an obelisk, the tea rooms, bridge, game larder, and revetment are all listed Grade II.

The gate lodge to the north east of the hall and the left and right front lodges are also listed Grade II, as is the entrance gateway and piers between the front lodges.

The Church of St Mary on the edge of the park has connections with the Tollemache family dating back to the Middle Ages. The church is filled with memorials to several generations of the family, including a large tomb with a verse describing four generations of Tollemaches.

In 8 September 2019 near the estate grounds, an Iron Age/Roman coin hoard of 748 coins dating to 47 AD during the Roman conquest of Britain was discovered. 63 coins entered the collection of the British Museum and Colchester and Ipswich Museums, the rest placed on auction at Noonans Mayfair on 18 September 2024. The proceeds is to be split between the finder and the current owners.

== Gardens ==
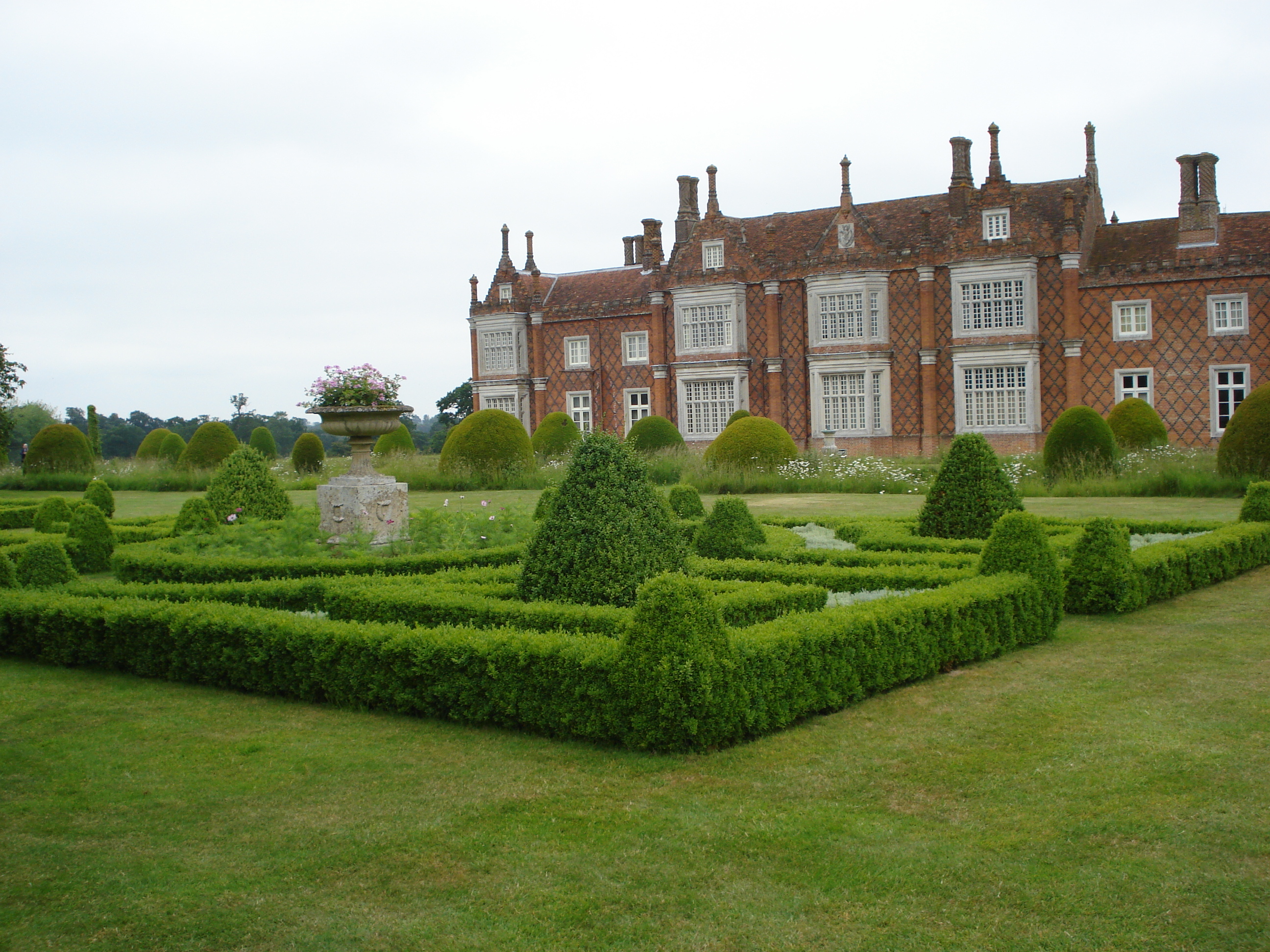
View of the house from across the Parterre

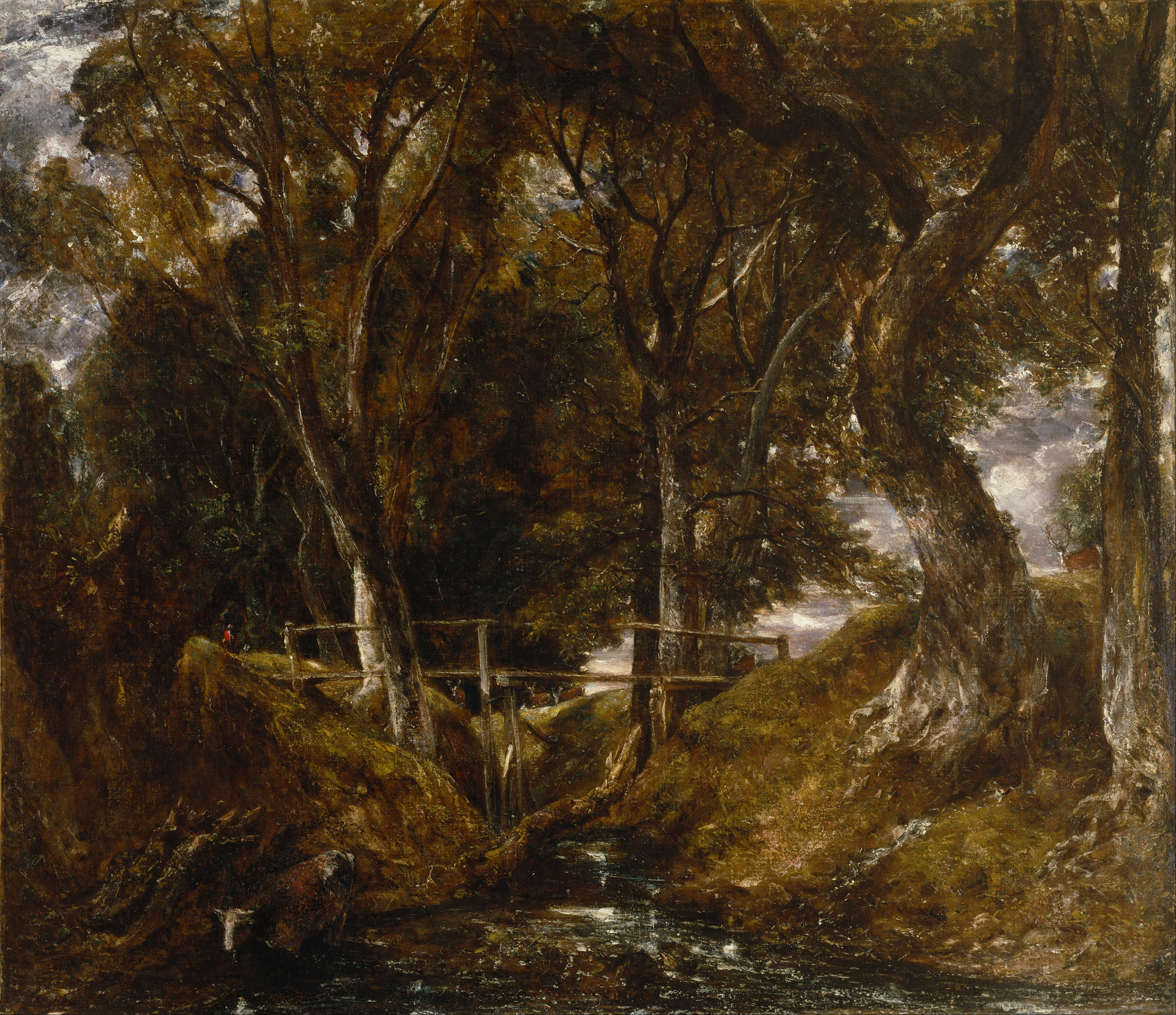
Helmingham Dell by John Constable, 1830

Though the house is not open to the public, Helmingham is best known for its fine gardens which are open to the public from May to September. There are semi-formal mixed gardens with extensive herbaceous borders, a rose garden, a knot garden, a parterre, a walled garden, an allée and an orchard. Beyond the gardens there is a 400-acre (1.6 km^{2}) deer park with herds of red and fallow deer.

Lady (Alexandra) Tollemache is a garden designer who works under the name Xa Tollemache. She supervises the gardens at Helmingham and has also worked on the Millennium Garden at Castle Hill in Devon, Dunbeath Castle in Scotland, and the Cloister Garden at Wilton House.

== Contents ==
The Tollemaches of Helmingham own one of the only two English Orpharion viols. Their instrument is dated 1580 and bears the label of John Rose, a 16th-century English viol-maker. Of the four John Rose viols which survive, this is the only one in private hands. It is believed to have been made for Queen Elizabeth I who presented it to them during one of her visits to Suffolk.

The "Tollemache lute manuscript" was acquired from the Helmingham Hall collections and sold by Sotheby's in 1965 to Robert Spencer. It was written by Henry Sampson. Robert Spencer maintained "Tollemache" in its common reference, despite the change of owner. The manuscript is now housed at the Royal Academy of Music.

Catherine Tollemache lived at the hall from 1581 to 1612, many household papers from her time survive, with her collection of contemporary and medieval recipes.

== In media ==
The hall has been used for filming including; BBC One's Antiques Roadshow; the Merchant Ivory film, The Golden Bowl and the 2019 BBC documentary Danny Dyer's Right Royal Family.

== See also ==
- List of country houses in the United Kingdom
