= Tollemache baronets =

Set index for Tollemache baronets

There have been two baronetcies for the surname Tollemache (/ˈtɒlmæʃ/ TOL-mash), or Talmash, one in the Baronetage of England and one in the Baronetage of Great Britain. As of 2026 the latter is extant.

- Tollemache baronets of Helmingham (1611)
- Manners baronents, later Talmash or Tollemache baronets of Hanby Hall (1793)
