= Helmingham =

Village in Suffolk, England

Coordinates: 52.173°N 1.203°E

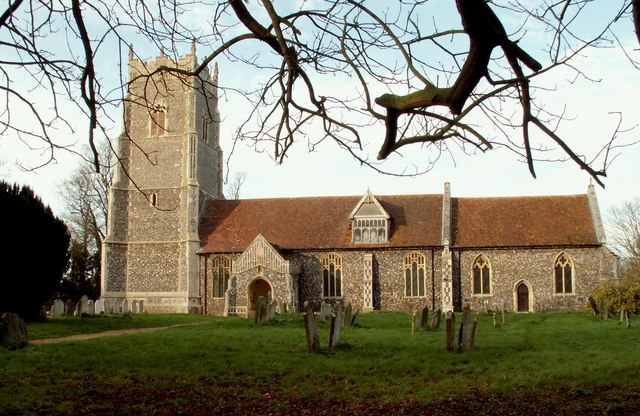
- St Mary’s Church, Helmingham

- Location within Suffolk
- Population: 186 (2011 Census)
- OS grid reference: TM1857
- District: Mid Suffolk
- Shire county: Suffolk
- Region: East
- Country: England
- Sovereign state: United Kingdom
- Post town: Stowmarket
- Postcode district: IP14
- Dialling code: 01473
- UK Parliament: Central Suffolk and North Ipswich

Helmingham is a village and civil parish in the Mid Suffolk district of Suffolk, England, 12 miles (20 km) east of Stowmarket, and 12 miles north (20 km) of Ipswich. It has a population of 170, increasing to 186 at the 2011 Census. It retains the same name by which it was recorded in the Domesday Book of 1086, namely Helmingheham, meaning 'the village of Helm's people'.

Helmingham Hall, a large red brick quadrangular mansion, dates from the reign of Henry VIII. The ancient family of Tollemache have been seated here from an early period after settling for a while at Bentley soon after the Norman Conquest of England. A Lionel Tollemache married the heiress of the Helmingham family so acquiring this estate in the 15th century.

The village was the birthplace of Faith Emmeline Backhouse, mother of the war poet John Gillespie Magee Jr.

In 1900, excavations in the Rectory garden unearthed a cemetery, possibly Roman, containing some 25 graves.

== Present day ==
The village is formed from the meeting of two roads, B1077 from the south-west to the north and B1079 from the south-east. Helmingham Hall is 500 metres west of this junction.

Its village church of St Mary's was first built as the estate church for the Hall. Sited on the edge of the park, it is filled with memorials to several generations of the Tollemache family, including a large tomb with a verse describing four generations of the family.

The village appears never to have had a public house.

The church at Helmingham, St Mary's, is the church featured in BBC sitcom Only Fools and Horses, in the 1987 Christmas special "The Frog's Legacy". Most of the episode's location scenes were filmed in nearby Ipswich, but due to film editing the church is depicted as being located next to a beach.
