= Gregory Cromwell, 1st Baron Cromwell =

English nobleman (c. 1520 – 1551)

The Right Honourable Gregory Cromwell KB
- Baron Cromwell
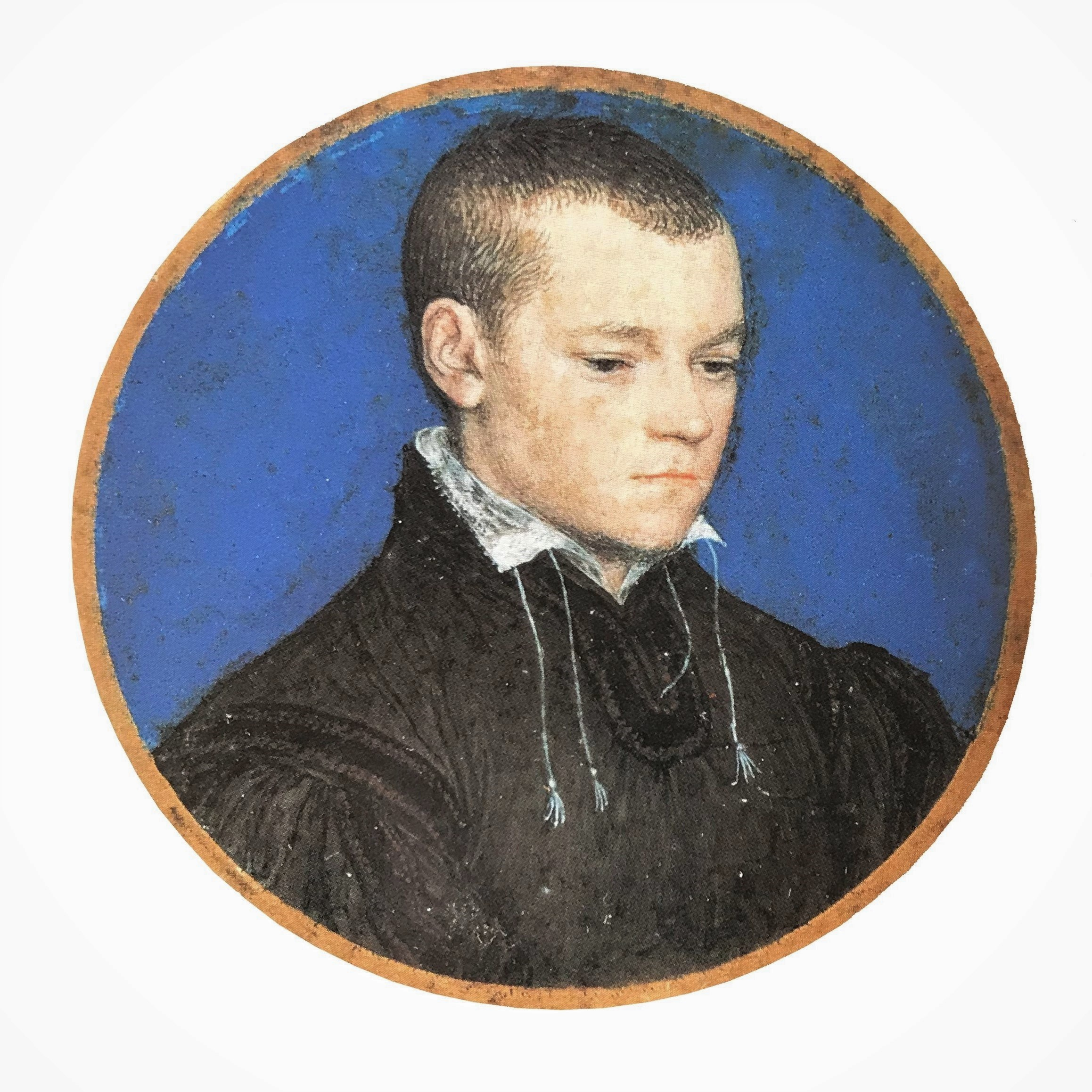
- Gregory Cromwell, circa 1535–1540, Hans Holbein the Younger

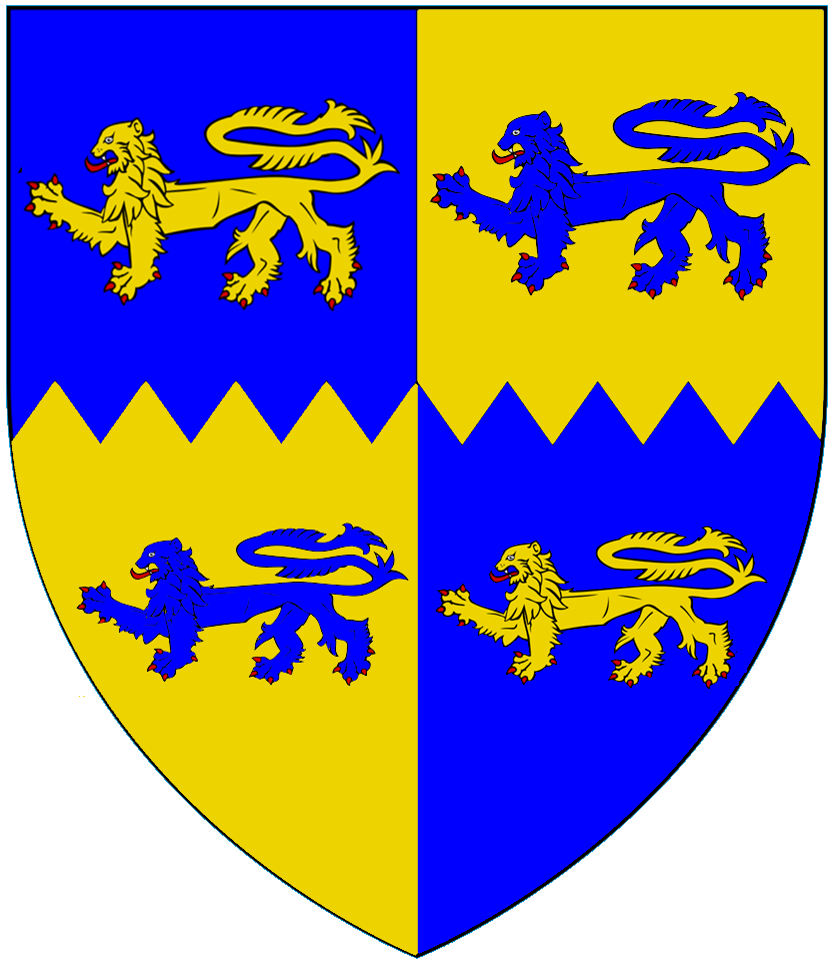
- Coat of arms
- Tenure: 1540–1551
- Successor: Henry Cromwell, 2nd Baron Cromwell
- Known for: Son of Thomas Cromwell
- Born: c. 1520; London, Kingdom of England
- Died: 4 July 1551 (aged 30–31); Launde Abbey, Leicestershire, Kingdom of England
- Cause of death: Sweating sickness
- Buried: Launde Abbey Chapel; 52.6313°N 0.82312°W
- Residence: Launde Abbey
- Locality: Leicestershire
- Spouse: Elizabeth Seymour (m. 1537)
- Issue: Henry Cromwell, 2nd Baron Cromwell; Edward Cromwell; Thomas Cromwell MP; Catherine Cromwell; Frances Cromwell
- Parents: Thomas Cromwell; Elizabeth Wyckes

Gregory Cromwell, 1st Baron Cromwell KB (c. 1520 – 4 July 1551) was an English nobleman. He was the only son of the Tudor statesman Thomas Cromwell (c. 1485 – 1540) and Elizabeth Wyckes (d. 1529).

Gregory's father Thomas Cromwell rose from obscurity to become the chief minister of Henry VIII, who attempted to modernize government at the expense of the privileges of the nobility and church. He used his office to promote religious reform and was one of the strongest advocates of the English Reformation.

In 1537, Gregory married Elizabeth, Lady Ughtred, widow of Sir Anthony Ughtred, sister to Jane Seymour and therefore became brother-in-law to Henry VIII and uncle to Edward VI. Gregory survived the dramatic fall from royal favour and subsequent execution of his father in 1540, as well as the ousting of his brother-in-law and patron, Edward Seymour, 1st Duke of Somerset, in 1549. He became a wealthy landowner, owning land and property in several counties in England, mainly in Rutland and Leicestershire. Gregory's family connections had provided him with wealth, property and privileges; however, it was through his own intelligence and ability, combined with the remarkable education and training provided by his father, that he was able to benefit from them, leaving his wife and family well provided for at his death. Gregory was succeeded by his eldest son, and heir, Henry.

Gregory Cromwell died in July 1551. He may be the subject of two portrait miniatures by Hans Holbein the Younger.

== Early years ==
Gregory Cromwell was born in London around 1520. Surviving letters suggest that the home where he lived with his father, mother and grandmother, Mercy Pryor, was a happy one. Gregory's father, Thomas Cromwell, had "The habit of not taking himself too seriously; the friendly and familiar atmosphere out of which this comes was evidently the atmosphere of Cromwell's house. And he seems to have early displayed that ready gratitude for kindness, that fidelity to those who had helped him, for which he became noted at home and abroad. People liked to go to his home and remembered their visit with pleasure."

A successful merchant and lawyer, Thomas Cromwell was a man of relatively humble beginnings whose intelligence and abilities enabled him to rise to become the most powerful man in England next to the King. His own father, Walter Cromwell, had been a jack of all trades – a blacksmith, fuller and brewer who had, from time to time, come to the attention of the authorities. Thomas Cromwell was sent to school as a boy, where he learned to read and write and was taught a little Latin. Thomas Cromwell provided a more extensive education for his own son, Gregory.

Thomas and Elizabeth had three surviving children – a son, Gregory, and two daughters, Anne and Grace. Thomas Cromwell's wife died early in 1529, and his daughters, Anne and Grace, are believed to have died not long after their mother. Provisions made for Anne and Grace in Thomas Cromwell's will, written on 12 July 1529, have been crossed out at a later date.

Thomas Cromwell had another daughter, Jane (c. 1530/5 – 1580) whose early life is a complete mystery. According to Hilary Mantel, "Cromwell had an illegitimate daughter, and beyond the fact that she existed, we know very little about her. She comes briefly into the records, in an incredibly obscure way – she's in the archives of the county of Chester." Jane married William Hough (c. 1527 – 1585), of Leighton in Wirrall, Cheshire, around 1550. William Hough was the son of Richard Hough (1505 – 1574) who was employed by Thomas Cromwell from 1534 to 1540 as his agent in Chester. It is unknown what role Thomas and Gregory Cromwell played in her life. Jane and her husband William Hough, together with their daughter, Alice, her husband, William Whitmore and their children, came to the attention of the authorities as recusant Catholics in the reign of Elizabeth I.

Gregory Cromwell came to share his father's interests and religious beliefs and was closely following the religious developments taking place in England while his father was in office. Gregory's close friends, William Cecil and Ralph Sadler, were known adherents of the reformed faith. A letter written to Gregory by Henry Dowes in March 1540 reveals that he was deeply concerned about the recantation of the vicar of Stepney, William Jerome. In his report to his former pupil, Dowes noted that "your comaundemente hath fully persuaded me you to be nott a litle desyrous to receyve knowledge after what sorte he behaved himselfe, aswell concernyng his Recantation, as also the reste of thinges conteyned in his saide Sermon."

After the deaths of his wife and daughters, Thomas Cromwell was devoted to his son, Gregory, and his sister Catherine's son, Richard Williams, and they were a close family. One of Richard's letters to his uncle bemoaned their separation from one another. He wrote that "I never more desired anything, than since your departure, to see you, nor thought time longer in your absence." Gregory was equally effusive in a letter where he asked only for his father's blessing, which he described as "more treasure unto me then all the abundance of worldly goods." Gregory remained close to his father and looked up to his older cousin, Richard Cromwell, who had distinguished himself by his military skill and gallantry. By the autumn of 1529, he had adopted the name, Cromwell. Richard left his cousin, Gregory "a great horse" in his will.

== Education ==
Be sure you shall have in him a wise quick piece Thomas Howard, 3rd Duke of Norfolk

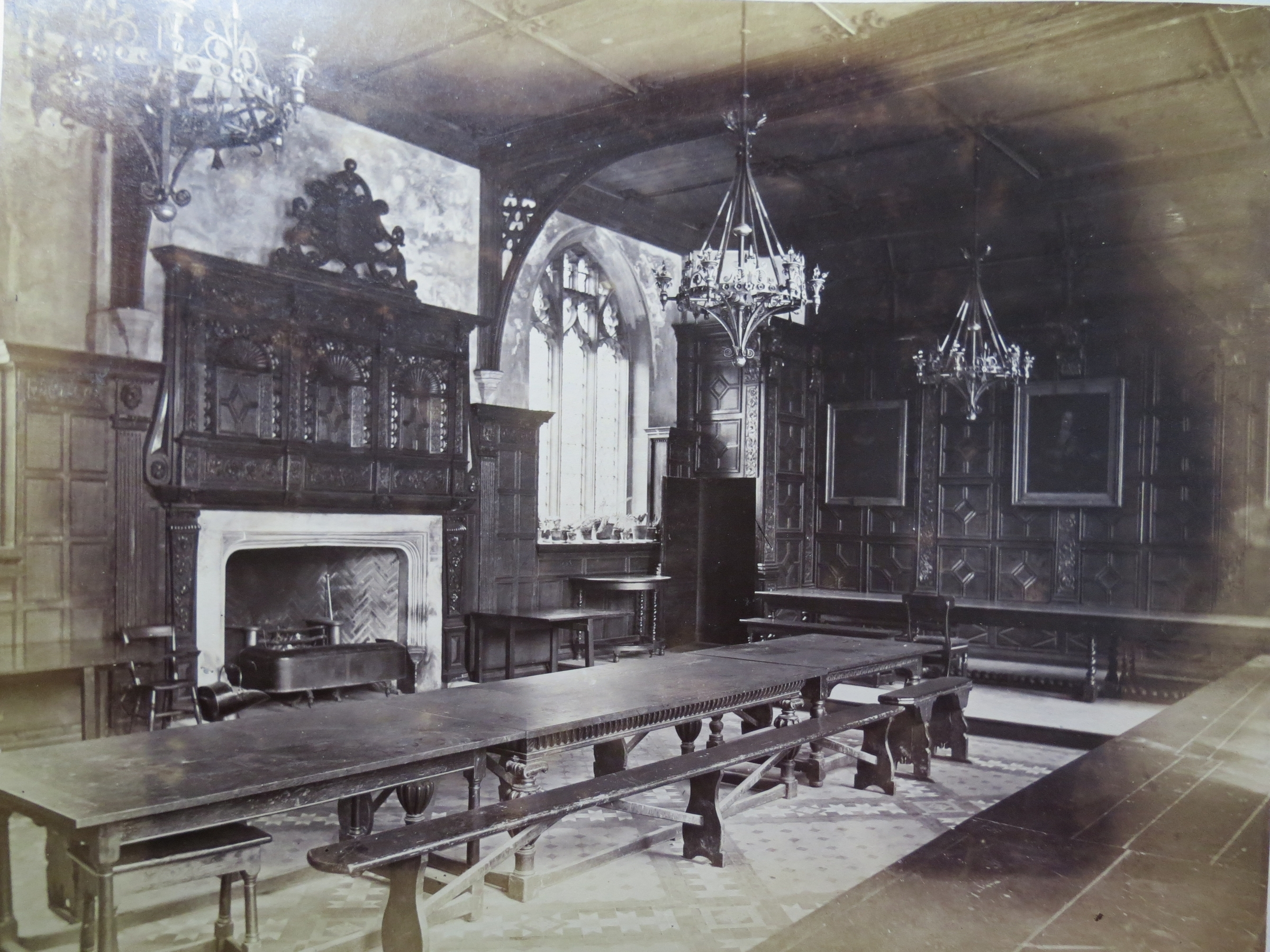
The original medieval dining hall of Pembroke College, Cambridge, since demolished and rebuilt

Thomas Cromwell ensured his son received the best possible education at Cambridge with a number of carefully selected tutors, often sending gifts to Gregory and his older companions, Nicholas Sadler and cousins, Christopher Wellyfed and another known only as Beresford, who were educated with him. Gregory was at Cambridge from 1528 to 1533. During his education, he resided in Pembroke Hall and Christ's College and at the homes of his father's friends and colleagues.

It has been incorrectly asserted by early historians such as John Sherren Brewer and R. B. Merriman and assumed by later historians like B.W. Beckingsale and David Loades that Gregory Cromwell was fourteen or fifteen when he was being educated at Cambridge in 1528 and therefore born around 1514. This has led to negative speculation about the boy's character and abilities which can be disproved. Gregory was, in fact, beginning his education and not undertaking a degree at the end of his education. He did not obtain a degree at Cambridge. That would have been unusual for a gentleman's son at that time, unless he had been destined for a career in the church.

Sir Henry Ellis stated that "The date of Gregory Cromwell's birth is not recorded, but it could hardly have been earlier than 1520." It appears that Henry Ellis was right and that Gregory Cromwell was a small boy in 1528, no more than eight years old. Letters from Gregory's supervisors, tutors and mentors during his education point to a year of birth of around 1520. As evidence that Gregory was very young in 1528, there are two letters written by John Chekyng, his tutor, to Thomas Cromwell, describing a little boy who plays and who is learning to read and write. The first letter, written in July 1528, states that his son Gregory "is not now at Cambridge, but in the country, where he works and plays alternately ... He is now studying the things most conducive to the reading of authors, and spends the rest of the day in forming letters." A second letter from Chekyng, written in November 1528, notes that "Little Gregory is becoming great in letters."

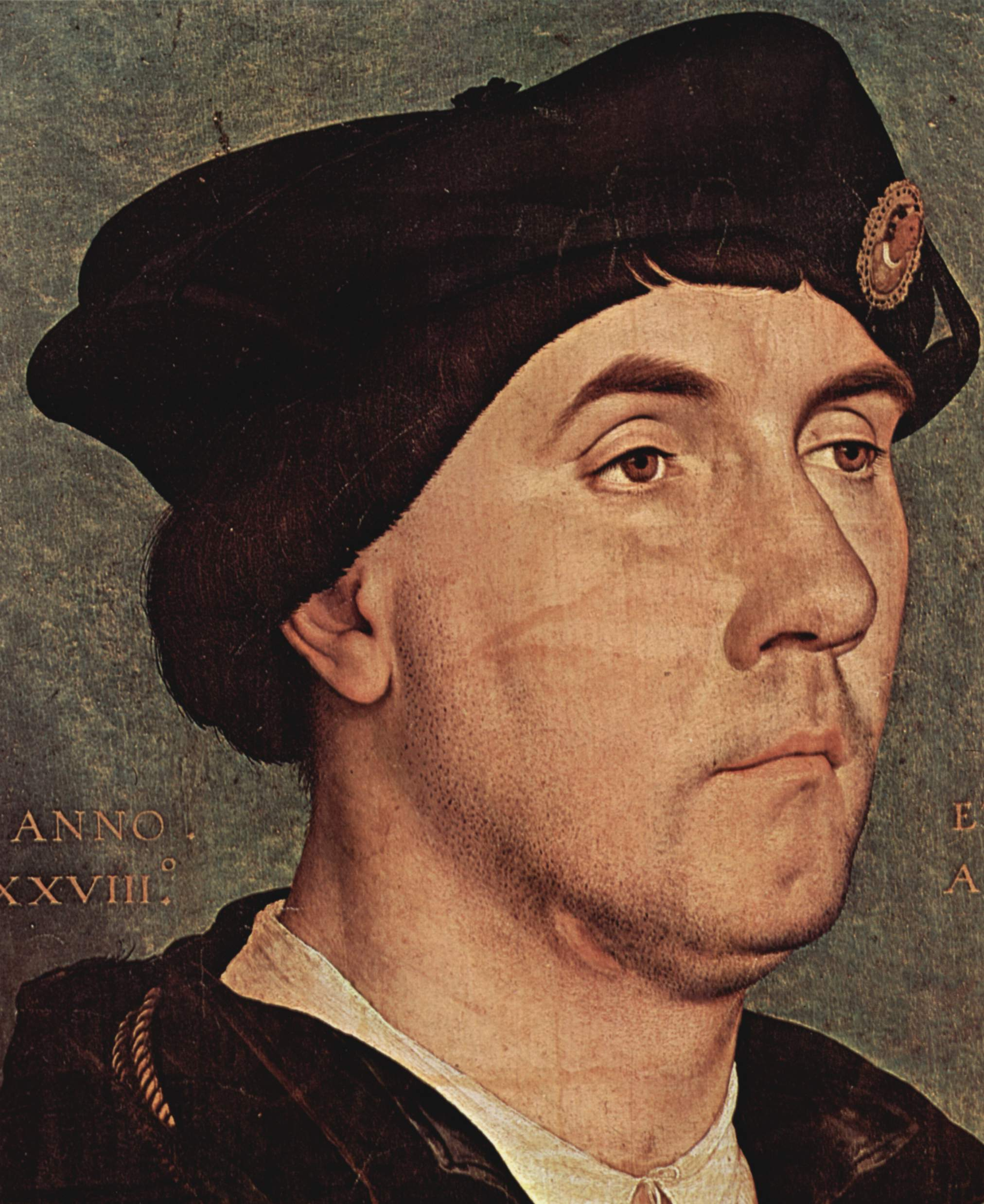
Sir Richard Southwell, a tutor to Gregory Cromwell; portrait by Holbein

Another letter to Thomas Cromwell, which can be dated to between September 1529 and Whitsuntide 1530, written by Margaret Vernon provides further proof of Gregory's young age. Vernon wrote "You promised that I should have the governance of the child till he was 12 years old. By that time he shall speak for himself if any wrong be offered him, for as yet he cannot, except by my maintenance."

After the death of his mother, Gregory was placed in the care of his father's friend, Margaret Vernon, Prioress of Little Marlow, in Buckinghamshire. At that time it was not unusual for gentlemen to place their young children in the care of nuns. As a rule the boys in nunneries were very young as it was not considered appropriate for them to stay with the nuns later than their ninth or tenth year. The nuns were permitted to educate only the girls. It was acceptable for young boys, up to the age of nine or ten, to be supervised by nuns, but not taught by them, and so they were usually accompanied by a male tutor.

Margaret Vernon wrote to Cromwell in 1528 stating that "Your son and his master are in good health, and now prosper in learning more in one day than before in a week, by reason of Nich. Saddelar, who is of very good conditions. Mr. Copland every morning gives each of them a laten, the which Nicholas doth bear away, as well Gregory's lesson as his own, and maketh the same Gregory perfect against his time of rendering. The master takes such comfort that he is with them three times a day." Gregory's older companion, Nicholas Sadler, may have been a younger brother or perhaps a cousin of Sir Ralph Sadler, Thomas Cromwell's personal secretary and close friend. Nicholas Sadler also had with him a "little gentlewoman", who Margaret wished permission to educate herself, to fill up her leisure intervals.

While Gregory was at Cambridge, his tutors included:

- John Chekyng, Fellow of Pembroke Hall, sophister, chosen 1519, reader of divinity, 1534.
- Henry Lockwood, Master of Christ's College, 1531–1548.
- John Hunt, (1514–1586), graduate of Cardinal College, Oxford, lawyer.

Gregory was later placed under the care and supervision of his father's friends and allies,

- Rowland Lee (died 1543), Bishop of Lichfield and Coventry. English Bishop. Educated at Cambridge, he received preferment under the patronage of Cardinal Thomas Wolsey, who employed him in the suppression of the monasteries (1528–29). He was greatly esteemed by Henry VIII and is believed to have performed the ceremony of Henry's marriage to Anne Boleyn (1533). He was one of the first bishops to take the oath of Supremacy recognizing Henry as Head of the Church.
- Sir Richard Southwell (1504–1564), Privy Councillor. Early in 1535, for some period, Gregory lived with Southwell in Woodrising Manor in Norfolk,

and

- Henry Dowes, (c. 1501–1550), the son of a wealthy Maldon merchant, who was mentor to Gregory Cromwell for several years. He supervised his pupil's tuition in Latin, French and other subjects. Dowes appears to have kept up his relationship with Gregory Cromwell after ceasing to be his mentor. In March 1540 he sent Gregory a detailed report of a sermon preached by the vicar of Stepney, William Jerome, which had included 'opprobrious words against the burgesses of the Parliament as calling them butterflies, dissemblers and knaves'.

Gregory Cromwell received dedications to three humanist works: Florentius Volusenus's version of Cicero's Dream of Scipio; David Clapham's translation of Heinrich Cornelius Agrippa's Commendation of Matrimony and Sir Richard Morrison's translation of Juan Luis Vives' Introduction to Wisdom.

In 1540, Sir Richard Morrison (c. 1513 – 1556), an English humanist scholar and diplomat who was a protégé of Thomas Cromwell, propagandist for Henry VIII, and then ambassador to the German court of Charles V for Edward VI, dedicated his translation of Introductio ad sapientiam by Vives to Gregory Cromwell.

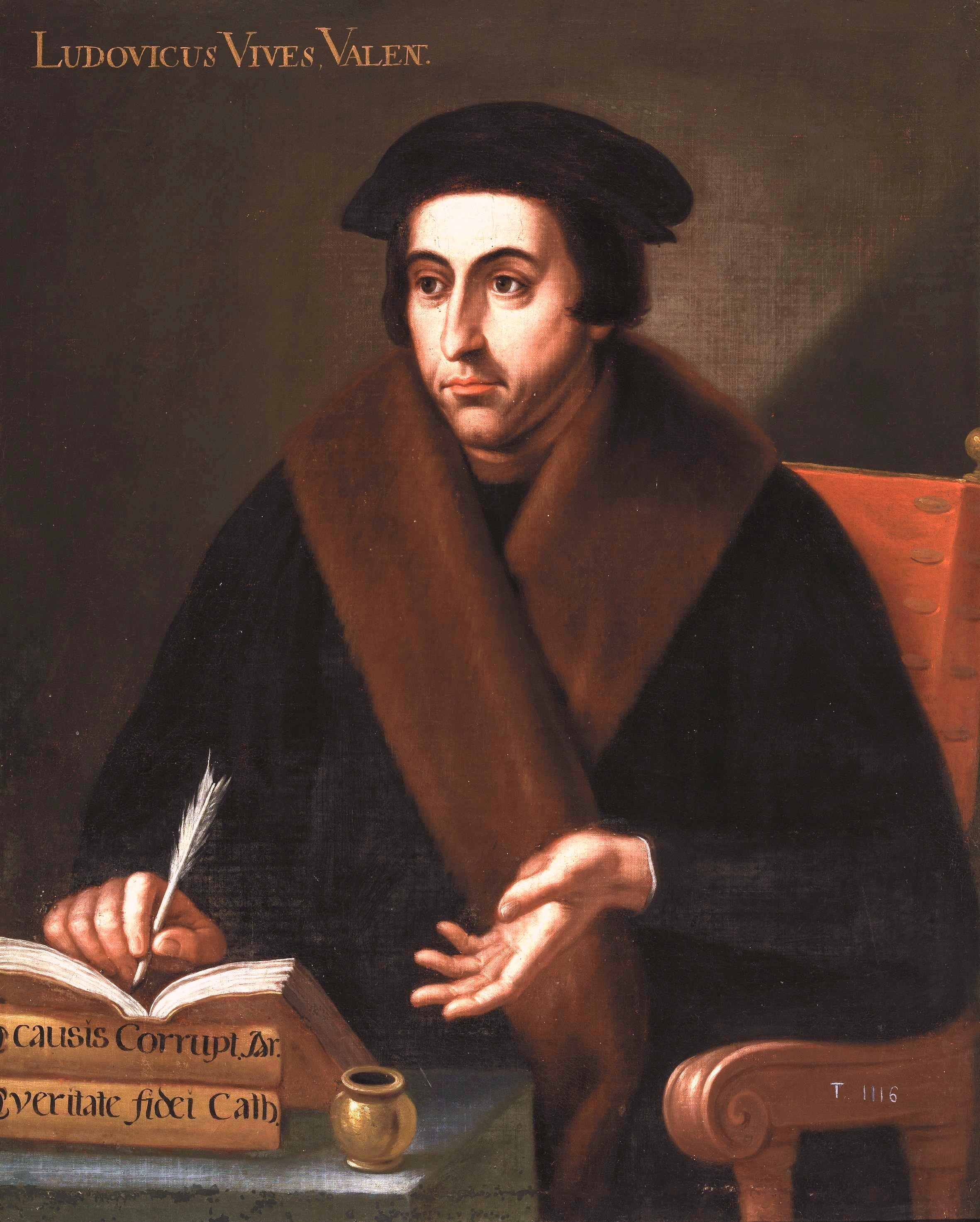
Juan Luis Vives, by an unknown artist

Vives' devotional work, The Introduction to Wisdom, a companion piece to the Instruction, was translated into English by Sir Richard Morison in 1540 and dedicated to the son of Thomas Cromwell. The translator is lavish in his praise of Vives: "This boke was gathered by Ludovicus Vives, a man greatly conversant in all good authours and excellentlye wel sene in all kindes of lerning." Vives' manual was extremely popular in the English schools, used as a textbook in the Tudor schools together with William Lily's Grammar."

Juan Luis Vives (1493–1540) was a Spanish humanist and educational theorist, who strongly opposed scholasticism and made his mark as one of the most influential advocates of humanistic learning in the early sixteenth century. His works are not limited to education but deal with a wide range of subjects including philosophy, psychology, politics, social reform and religion.

Thomas Cromwell, influenced by the humanist view of preparation for the active life, took great pains with his son's education, although the boy's studies were not always conducted along humanist lines. Cromwell approved a curriculum including the study of the works of Erasmus, English and ancient history, music, and exercise with arms for Gregory. He provided for his son, the sort of education which Sir Thomas Elyot was advocating for the ruling class.

In a letter to Thomas Cromwell, Henry Dowes, Gregory's preceptor, details how his son studied French, Latin, English, accounting, music and Roman and Greek history. He practised the longbow, played the lute and virginals and shared his father's love of hunting, hawking and riding. Gregory and his cousin, Christopher Wellyfed were permitted to indulge their love of hunting during breaks in their studies. Gregory promised his father that he would do his best at all times ... although he needed a little encouragement!

On the whole, Gregory's tutors seemed to be happy with his progress. In November 1528, John Chekyng advised his father that "Little Gregory is becoming great in letters." Margaret Vernon noted in 1529, that Gregory "is in good health, and is a very good scholar, and can construe his paternoster and creed. When you next come to me I doubt not that you shall like him very well." At that time, young children practised reading from religious texts, the primer, containing the Paternoster, Ave Maria, Creed and other common prayers and liturgical works like the antiphonal and the psalter. In the case of boys, the learning of Latin grammar also involved religious material. An elementary exercise might take the form of studying and analysing the basic prayers in their Latin forms, as Gregory is mentioned by Vernon, learning to translate the Paternoster and the Creed from Latin.

The lure of the countryside could prove a distraction to an active boy, who needed to be pulled back into line. Henry Dowes wrote to Cromwell in September 1534 explaining that he had used every effort to advance Gregory in his studies, but "forcause summer was spent in the service of the wild gods, it is so much to be regarded after what fashion youth is brought up". However, by April 1535, Dowes was able to report to his father that "his improvement is greater than at any time here before, partly because he is brought into some awe and dread, and is ready to give himself to learning when required, partly because those things which formerly alienated his mind from study are now withdrawn."

Gregory excelled in athletic pursuits. Dowes reported to Cromwell in September 1535, that his son "for his recreation he useth to hawke and hunte, and shote in his long bowe, which frameth and succedeth so well with hime that he semeth to be therunto given by nature."

Towards the end of Gregory's education, the boy was to become an asset to his father and a help to his mentor, Rowland Lee, Bishop of Coventry and Lichfield, in Ludlow. The Bishop had written to Cromwell on 19 January 1536 to ask for assistance, now that he had to "learn a new school, to play with pen and counters, for the King's grace's money." Believing that it would be difficult for him without some help, he asked Cromwell to "please send me my lover Mr. Gregory, for though the thieves have hanged me in imagination, I trust to be even with them shortly." During his time in Wales, Rowland Lee came to be known as the "hanging bishop" for the harsh measures taken in an attempt to curb widespread lawlessness.

One man, in particular, was impressed by the young Gregory. Thomas Howard, 3rd Duke of Norfolk, reported to Cromwell in August 1536 that his son was in good health and, "sparing no horseflesh to run after the deer and hounds. I trust you will not be discontent that I now cause him to forbear his book. Be sure you shall have in him a wise quick piece."

It would appear that Gregory Cromwell, and John More, the son of Thomas More, have been wrongly assumed to have been unintelligent, simply because they happened to be overshadowed by their extraordinary fathers. It is evident that Cromwell's son was a capable scholar, who besides mastering Latin, French and accounting, had learned to play the lute and virginals and excelled in the outdoor pursuits of riding, hunting with the longbow and hawking. He was athletic and therefore had much in common with his older cousin, the courtier Richard Cromwell. It is apparent that Gregory Cromwell was an intelligent, well-educated and accomplished young man who must have been a source of pride to his father.

Gregory had received an extensive education to prepare him for adult life. Now that his education was complete, he was ready to marry and begin a career in his father's service.

== Marriage and issue ==
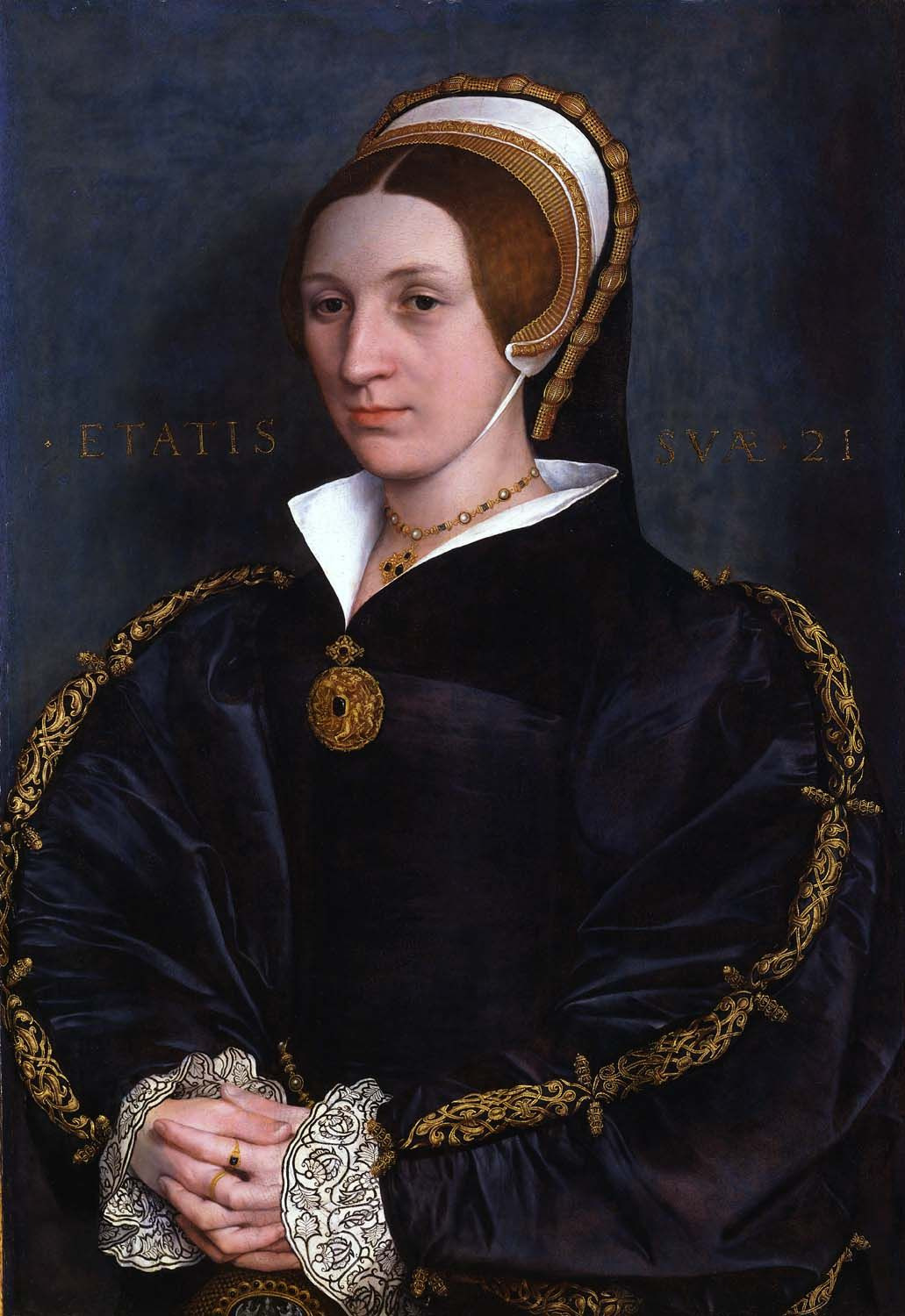
Portrait of a Lady, probably a Member of the Cromwell Family, perhaps Elizabeth Seymour, c.1535–1540, Hans Holbein the Younger

In March 1537 Elizabeth, Lady Ughtred wrote to Thomas Cromwell from York to seek his favour in acquiring one of the soon-to-be dissolved monasteries. Aged about 19, she was the widow of Sir Anthony Ughtred (who had died in 1534); a younger daughter of Sir John Seymour; and sister of Queen Jane Seymour and future Lord Protector Edward Seymour. The opportunity was not lost on Cromwell. He proposed instead that she marry his son and heir, Gregory. By June it appears that Cromwell's offer had been accepted, although Gregory had not been her only suitor. Sir Arthur Darcy had written to her on 15 June, regretting his loss: "If I do tarry here in the country, I would have been glad to have had you likewise, but sure it is, as I said, that some southern lord shall make you forget the North." The couple were married on 3 August 1537 at Mortlake.

Historian Derek Wilson has observed that, in marrying his son, Gregory, to the then-queen's younger sister, Thomas Cromwell became "related by marriage to the king, an event well worth recording for posterity by a portrait of his daughter-in-law." A portrait by Hans Holbein dated circa 1535–1540 exhibited at the Toledo Museum of Art as Portrait of a Lady, probably a Member of the Cromwell Family (1926.57), once thought to be Queen Catherine Howard, may instead depict the wife of Gregory Cromwell. The lady is wearing a French hood, her sleeves are said to follow a style set by Anne of Cleves and she has wonderful blackwork decorating her cuffs. Born in around 1518, Elizabeth was probably in her 21st year in 1539 or 1540 and about the right age to be the sitter. The portrait may have been commissioned by Thomas Cromwell between January 1540 and early June 1540 when Anne of Cleves was queen consort and before his arrest. It is also possible that a portrait of Gregory was painted at the same time and has not survived.

It appears that Elizabeth had two children from her marriage to Ughtred. Sir Richard Southwell wrote to Thomas Cromwell in August 1537 that he had seen "a child of my lady your daughter's at Wylberffosse nunnery, Yorksh., who was in good health at the writing of this." As the writer refers to my lady your daughter, he could only be referring to Cromwell's new daughter-in-law, Lady Ughtred, and the child was in Yorkshire, where she had been living in the years since her marriage. This child may have been Henry Ughtred, born around 1533, in Jersey, or Margery Ughtred of Kexby, Yorkshire, who married William Hungate of Burnby, Yorkshire.

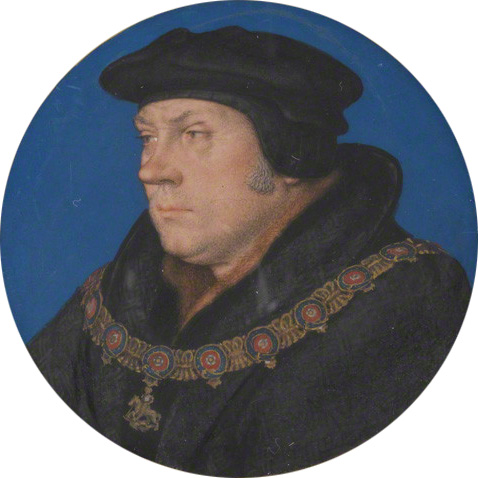
Thomas Cromwell, after Hans Holbein the Younger

Elizabeth assured her new father-in-law that "which doth comfort me most in the world, that I find your lordship is contented with me, and that you will be my good lord and father the which, I trust, never to deserve other, but rather to give cause for the continuance of the same".

It is unknown whether it was Thomas Cromwell or Edward Seymour who suggested the match, but the marriage appears to have been happy and Elizabeth's brother and father-in-law were certainly on friendly terms. Edward Seymour, then Viscount Beauchamp, wrote to Cromwell on 2 September 1537 to know how he has fared since the writer's departure. Wishes Cromwell were with him, when he should have had the best sport with bow, hounds, and hawks and sends commendations to his brother-in-law and sister, adding "and I pray God to send me by them shortly a nephew."

Gregory and Elizabeth had five children:

- Henry Cromwell, 2nd Baron Cromwell, (1538 – 1592), married before 1560, Mary Paulet, daughter of John Paulet, 2nd Marquess of Winchester. The couple had three children:

- Edward Cromwell, 3rd Baron Cromwell, (c. 1559 – 27 April 1607), married first Elizabeth Upton (died 1592/3), of Puslinch, Devon, and then Frances Rugge (died 1631) of Felmingham, Norfolk, by whom he had a son, Thomas Cromwell, 1st Earl of Ardglass and two daughters, Frances and Anne.
- Sir Gregory Cromwell, married Frances, daughter of Sir Edward Griffin of Dingley, Northamptonshire.
- Catherine Cromwell (1557 – 24 March 1621), married on 10 February 1581 at North Elmham, Norfolk, Sir Lionel Tollemache, 1st Baronet, of Helmingham, Suffolk (1562 – 1612), son of Sir Lionel Tollemache and Susan Jermyn. They had seven children, including Sir Lionel Tollemache, 2nd Baronet.

- Edward Cromwell (1539 – bef. 1553.)
- Thomas Cromwell, (c. 1540 – died between February 1610 and April 1611), educated at St John's College, Cambridge.
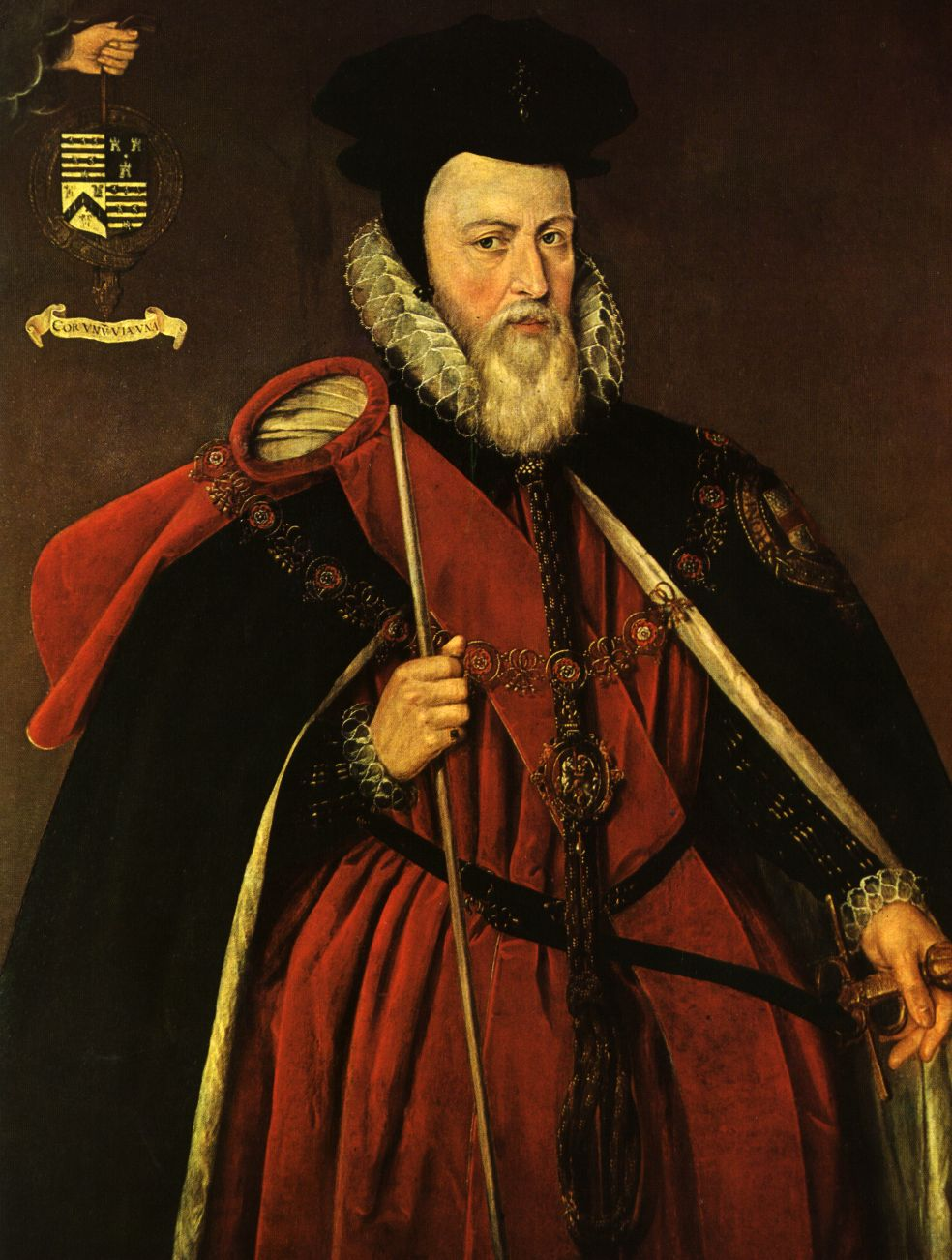
  William Cecil, in the robes of the garter
  Married, August 1580, Catherine (died 1615/1616), daughter of Thomas Gardner of Coxford; 5 sons, 4 daughters.

He was an English Member of Parliament during the reign of Elizabeth I. His diaries of proceedings in the House of Commons are an important source for historians of parliamentary history during the period when he was a member, and Sir John Neale draws heavily upon them in his groundbreaking study of Elizabeth I and Her Parliaments, vol. I (1559–1581), 1953, vol. II ( 1584–1601), 1957.

Sir William Cecil (later Lord Burghley), a friend of his father, may have found him his seats at Fowey, Bodmin and Grampound, possibly by arrangement with the Earl of Bedford at Fowey and Bodmin.

His return at Preston in 1584 is accounted for by the patronage of Sir Ralph Sadler, chancellor of the Duchy of Lancaster, who was brought up in the household of Cromwell's grandfather, Thomas Cromwell, 1st Earl of Essex. Neale has described Thomas Cromwell as "the model type of parliamentarian, deeply versed in the history and procedure of the institution, though lacking in historical perspective; eminently responsible, but fearless in defence of liberty." He was a puritan, but his zeal did not cloud his judgment, which, with his knowledge of procedure, rendered him one of the most experienced committeemen of his time. He served on nearly 100 committees, and wrote journals covering the sessions of Parliament in 1572, 1576, 1581 and 1584, now in the library of Trinity College, Dublin.

- Catherine Cromwell, (c. 1541– ) wife of John Strode of Parnham, Dorset, son of Robert Strode and Elizabeth Hody. They had six children.
- Frances Cromwell, (c. 1544 – 7 February 1562) on 11 November 1560 at Compton, Hampshire, married Richard Strode of Newnham, Devon, son of William III Strode (1512–1579) by his wife Elizabeth Courtenay, daughter and heiress of Philip Courtenay of Loughtor, a younger son of Sir Philip Courtenay (died 1488) of Molland in North Devon. They had one son, William Strode (died 1637), MP.

== Death of Queen Jane ==
Presumably, Gregory was still in his father's service, and he and his wife were living in one of Thomas Cromwell's many houses after the marriage, however, there is no mention of Gregory and Elizabeth in the records until the death of Queen Jane on 24 October 1537, less than three months after their wedding. On 12 November they took part in the late Queen's funeral procession. Gregory and his cousin, Richard Cromwell carried banners; their wives were among the principal mourners. Her sister's death was not only a personal tragedy for Elizabeth, but it was to have long-term repercussions for the Cromwells, particularly for Thomas Cromwell.

== Career and public life, 1537–1539 ==
After his marriage, Gregory continued his training in his father's service. During his career, he held several offices, including:

- Justice of the peace, Sussex, 1538
- Ranger, Rutland Forest, 1545
- Commissioner, Musters, Leicestershire, 1546
- Commissioner, Relief, 1550
- various other commissions 1539–1551

=== Lewes ===
The couple's first child, Henry, was baptised 1 March 1538, probably at Hampton Court, where the Lady Mary almost certainly stood godmother. Shortly after the baptism, Gregory and his wife left for Lewes in Sussex, arriving with a large retinue at the former Cluniac Priory of St Pancras, recently acquired by Thomas Cromwell.

While in Sussex, Gregory became a justice of the peace, which was his first official position. The site and possessions of the Priory of St Pancras, Lewes were granted to Thomas Cromwell and his heirs, on 16 February 1538. Their extent was considerable. The demolition of the monastery began without delay, however the Priory House was not demolished and was reserved as a place of residence for the new owner. In a letter to his father in April, Gregory Cromwell gives the details of his arrival, and of the warm reception and presents given to him and his wife, by the families of the neighbourhood. However, the rats of Lewes had presents of their own, and in May, a plague had broken out in the town. The couple left Lewes and hastily retreated to another of Thomas Cromwell's houses called "The Motte" about four miles away from the town. In late June, the King was expected to come to Lewes in his Progress. Gregory Cromwell wrote to his father to inform him that the plague had not completely abated in the town. Gregory and his wife were to leave Sussex in 1539, and their household at Lewes was disbanded after Gregory was accused of a serious offence and refused his penance.

=== Leeds Castle ===
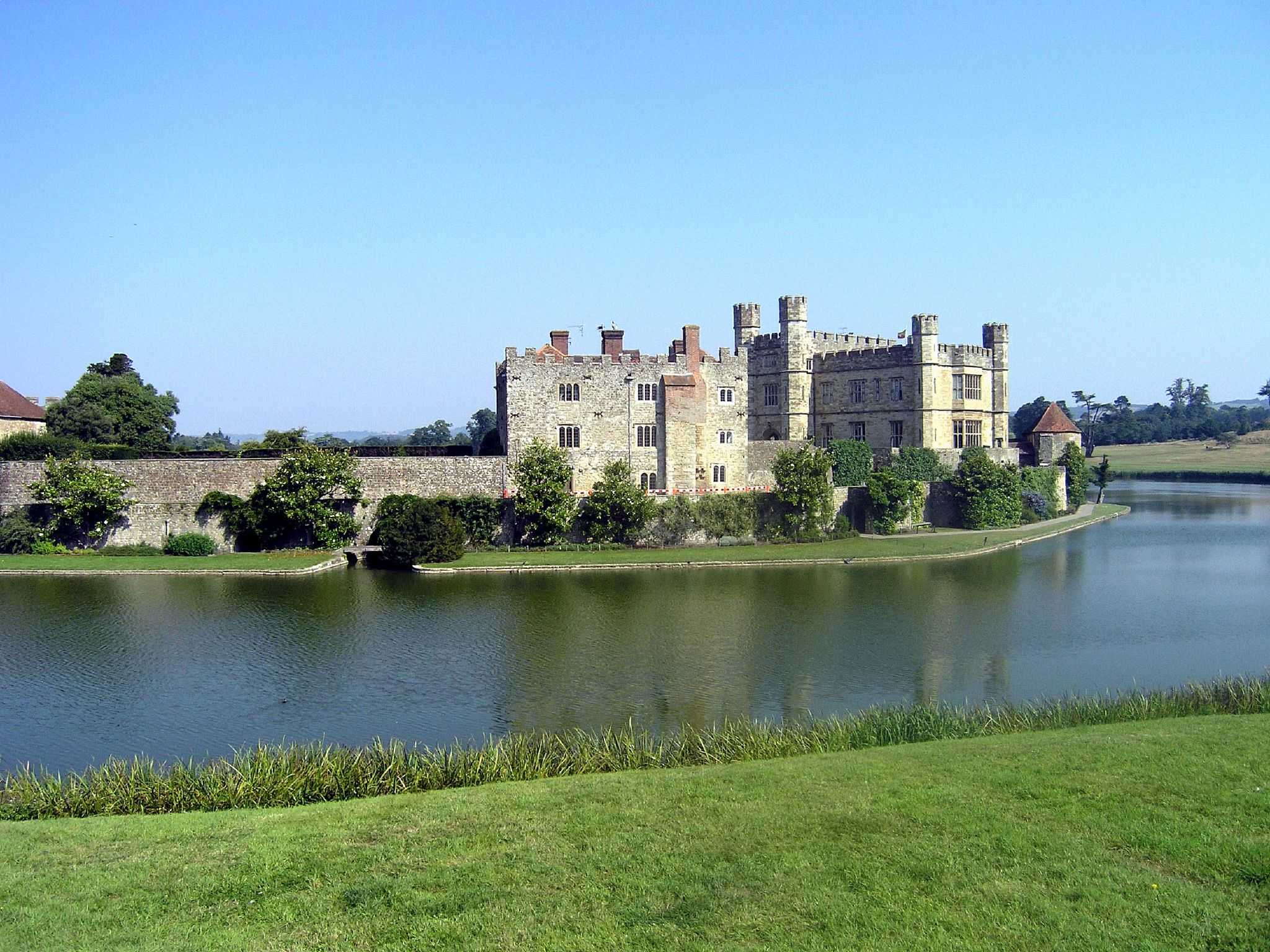
Leeds Castle in Kent

After the appointment of Thomas Cromwell as Constable of Leeds Castle, Kent, in January 1539, his son Gregory and his wife moved into the castle. Gregory and his wife lived mainly at Leeds Castle at Thomas Cromwell's expense from their arrival until his arrest in June 1540. Living there qualified Gregory for election as one of the knights of the shire for Kent to the Parliament of that year. His partner, the Lord Warden of the Cinque Ports, Sir Thomas Cheyney, presumably ensuring his return at the request of his father. It is notable that Gregory Cromwell was under the age of majority of twenty-one. His election is to be seen as one move in Thomas Cromwell's campaign to ensure a "tractable" Parliament.

==== Welcoming Anne of Cleves at Calais ====
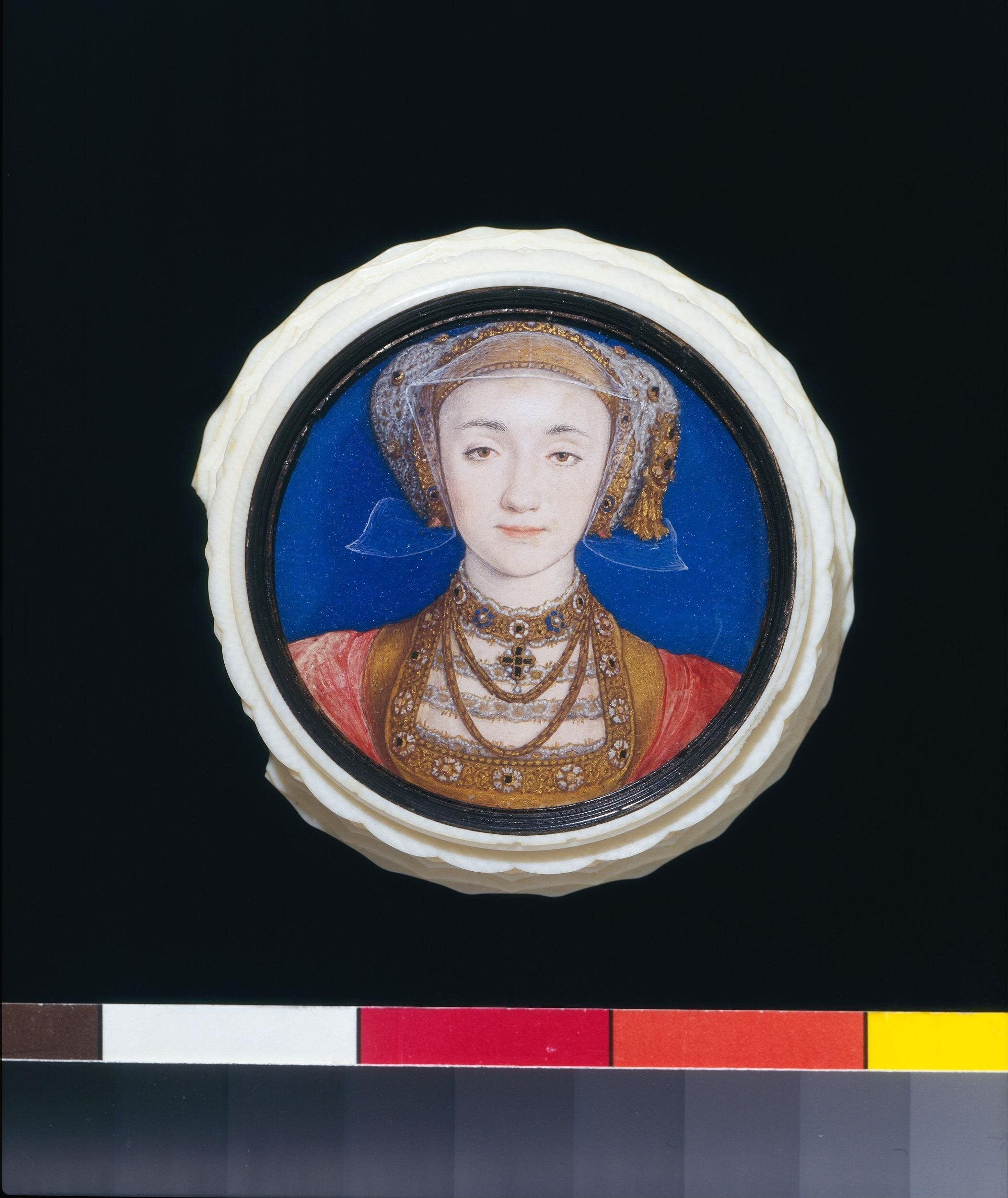
Anne of Cleves, miniature by Holbein

Gregory was summoned to Parliament on 28 April 1539. In December 1539, during its second prorogation, he travelled to Calais to welcome Anne of Cleves. Gregory wrote several letters to his father at this time, detailing the difficulties of the crossing from Dover to Calais (a twelve-hour journey), reporting that many of the gentlemen with him were "extremely vexed with sickness" and assuring his father that he and the Lord High Admiral, William FitzWilliam, 1st Earl of Southampton, were not among them. More than likely, this was his first time on board a ship and away from the English mainland. He describes his impressions at the first sight of Calais, how he has seen the castle and the blockhouses and other fortresses and recounts the delights of the feasting, entertainments and jousting while waiting for Henry VIII's new bride.

Gregory also wrote to his wife from Calais, addressing her as his "loving bedfellow", describing the arrival of Anne of Cleves, and requesting news "as well of yourself as also my little boys, of whose increase and towardness be you assured I am not a little desirous to be advertised."

The Admiral and his entourage spent about nine days in Calais before the arrival of Anne of Cleves, passing the time, in part, with tournaments and other amusements. Anne of Cleves arrived on Thursday 11 December. "She arrived within the English pale at Calais between 7 and 8 a.m., and was received by the lord Deputy, the Lieutenant of the Castle, the Knight Porter, and the Marshal of Calais, Sir George Carow, Captain of Resbanke, and the Captain of the Spears, well appointed with great horses, and with them, the men of arms, in velvet coats and gold chains, and all the archers in the King's livery well appointed; "and so brought her towards Calais, a gentleman of arms of the King's and another of hers riding together."

Within a mile of Calais, she was received by the Earl of Southampton, Lord High Admiral, with William Howard, 1st Baron Howard of Effingham, Sir Francis Bryan, William Grey, 13th Baron Grey de Wilton, Lord Hastings, Lord Clifford, Lord Herbert, Lord Tailbush, Sir Thomas Seymour, Sir Henry Knyvett, Mr. Gregory Cromwell, with "xxiiij" gentlemen in coats of satin damask and velvet, besides the said lords, who wore three collars of cloth of gold and purple velvet and chains of gold, and 200 yeomen, &c., in the King's colours, red and blue cloth. "Then the King's ships off Newland as she came by them let 200 shots of guns", after which the town of Calais shot 300 pieces of ordnance.

When she came to the Lantern Gate, she stayed and viewed the king's ships, the Lion and the Sweepstake, decked with 100 banners of silk and gold, wherein were 200 master gunners and mariners and 31 trumpets, "and a double drum that was never seen in England before"; and so her Grace entered into Calais. At her entry, 150 pieces of ordnance let out of the said two ships made such a smoke that one of her train could not see another. "Where stood in order on both sides the streets, like a lane, with 500 soldiers in the King's livery of the retinue of Calais, and the mayor of Calais with his brethren, and the commons of Calais, and the merchants of the Staple, stood in like manner in array, and made a lane wherethrough she passed to her lodging". There the mayor and his brethren came to her and gave her 50 sovereigns of gold, and the mayor of the Staple, 60. Next morning "she had a gun shot, justing and all other royalty that could be devised in the King's garrison;" and kept open household there for the 15 days that she remained." The Admiral had been instructed by Henry VIII to "cheer my lady and her train so they think the time short". Anne knew little English, so, with the assistance of an interpreter, he taught her to play "Sent" and other card games that the king enjoyed, with Gregory Cromwell taking part.

The journey to England was planned for Friday afternoon; however, the weather proved so rough that it was futile to think of crossing at that time. The Lord High Admiral entertained Anne of Cleves on the Saturday by showing her the ship prepared for her passage, with the other ships in the harbour, gaily decorated and with men on the tops, shrouds, and yard-arms. Guns were shot off in her honour, and after a banquet there was jousting. The high winds and rough seas continued until Saturday the 27th, when the weather was favourable for the crossing and Anne of Cleves finally arrived in England, landing at Deal, in Kent.

=== The great London muster, 1539 ===
In 1539, in response to the potential threat of invasion by his Roman Catholic enemies, Charles V, Holy Roman Emperor and Francis I of France, Henry VIII prepared for the worst by fortifying the coasts and fitting out his navy, and ordered a muster of all his male subjects, aged from sixteen to sixty. The Lord Mayor of London Sir William Forman ordered a general muster of the citizens to be held at Mile End on Thursday, 8 May. It was a formidable display of the King's power – three divisions, each of five thousand men and their attendants marched through the city to the Palace of Westminster, where the King stood in his gatehouse, to see them as they passed by. The size of the muster was estimated, by the Lord Chancellor, Thomas Audley, to have been about 16,500 men. Thomas Cromwell played his part, sending a great number of men and weapons among the citizens of London. They were led by a forest of pike-men, bowmen and gunners in the thousands, and followed by weaponry drawn on carts, moving through the city to parade past Henry VIII at Westminster. Cromwell's son and heir, Gregory and his nephew, Richard Cromwell rode with muster, together with Christopher Morris, Master of the Ordinance, "and other of the Kinges servantes." They followed "the end of the last battell, rydinge on goodly horses and well apparayled."

== The fall of Thomas Cromwell, 1540 ==
1540 was to be a year of triumphs and tears for the Cromwell family. In January, Elizabeth was appointed to the household of the new Queen, Anne of Cleves. In March, during a virtual witch-hunt against 'heretical' preachers by Stephen Gardiner, Bishop of Winchester, Gregory Cromwell requested Henry Dowes to write a letter detailing the recantation of William Jerome, Vicar of Stepney. This was significant, as Stepney was Thomas Cromwell's church, where he and his family worshipped. Gardiner was firing a warning shot in his rival's direction. Still rising in royal favour, Thomas Cromwell was created Earl of Essex on 17 April, and his son, Gregory assumed the courtesy title of Lord Cromwell (from his father's secondary title of Baron Cromwell, of Wimbledon in the County of Surrey). The arms granted to Gregory Cromwell were four coats, quarterly; 1st, quarterly, per fess indented, azure, and or, four lions passant, counterchanged; 2nd, per fess, or and gules, on a pale between two lis, azure, and two pelicans of the first, a pelican and lis, all counterchanged; 3rd, azure, on a fess, between three lions rampant, a rose, gules, between two Cornish choughs; 4th, Prior, as before, and the motto, "Faire mon devoir". On 18 April, Thomas Cromwell was made Lord Great Chamberlain.

=== The May Day jousts, 1540 ===
In May 1540, Gregory, now Lord Cromwell, and his cousin Richard Cromwell took part in the May Day jousts which were held at the Palace of Westminster. The jousts began on Saturday, 1 May, and lasted for a week. The jousts had been announced in France, Flanders, Scotland and Spain for all who would compete against the challengers of England.

The challengers included Sir John Dudley, Sir Thomas Seymour, Sir Thomas Poyninge, Sir George Carew, Anthony Kingston, and Richard Cromwell. The challengers entered the lists that day richly dressed, their horses trapped in white velvet, with knights and gentlemen riding ahead of them, dressed in white velvet and white sarcenet, and all their servants in white sarcenet doublets and hose, in the Burgundian fashion. To joust against them, forty-six defendants entered, led by Henry Howard, Earl of Surrey, including Lord William Howard, Lord Edward Clinton, Lord Gregory Cromwell, and others, who were all richly dressed. After the jousting had ended the challengers rode to Durham Place, which was lavishly decorated, with great cupboards of plate on display and where they kept open household during the tournament. Delicious foods and drinks were plentiful and minstrels played continually. Elaborate feasts and suppers were provided there, which were attended by the King, the Queen and her ladies, all the court, and all other comers. The guests "were served every meal with their own servants after the manner of war, their drum warning all the officers of household against every meal." On the second day of the jousts, Anthony Kingston and Richard Cromwell were made knights. Cromwell so impressed the King with his valour, that he was given a diamond ring from the King's own finger.

=== A gathering storm ===
The wave of success was to be short-lived for Thomas Cromwell. Stephen Gardiner, Bishop of Winchester, a traditionalist conservative, was determined to destroy his arch-enemy, Cromwell, by accusing him of supporting heretical preachers, thereby undoing his programme of religious reforms. At the same time, Cromwell's political rival and religious conservative, Thomas Howard, 3rd Duke of Norfolk, who had pushed hard for the Act of Six Articles to be passed in Parliament, was rising in favour and fast becoming a threat. The Act of Six Articles, which reaffirmed certain Catholic principles in Henry VIII's Church of England, had been passed in May 1539. Henry VIII had now drawn a line in the sand on religious reform and Cromwell found himself in an untenable position with regard to his reformist policies. French Ambassador Charles de Marillac noted "the division among this King's ministers, who are trying to destroy each other." Cromwell's party seemed to have the upper hand, however the situation was about to take a turn for the worse.

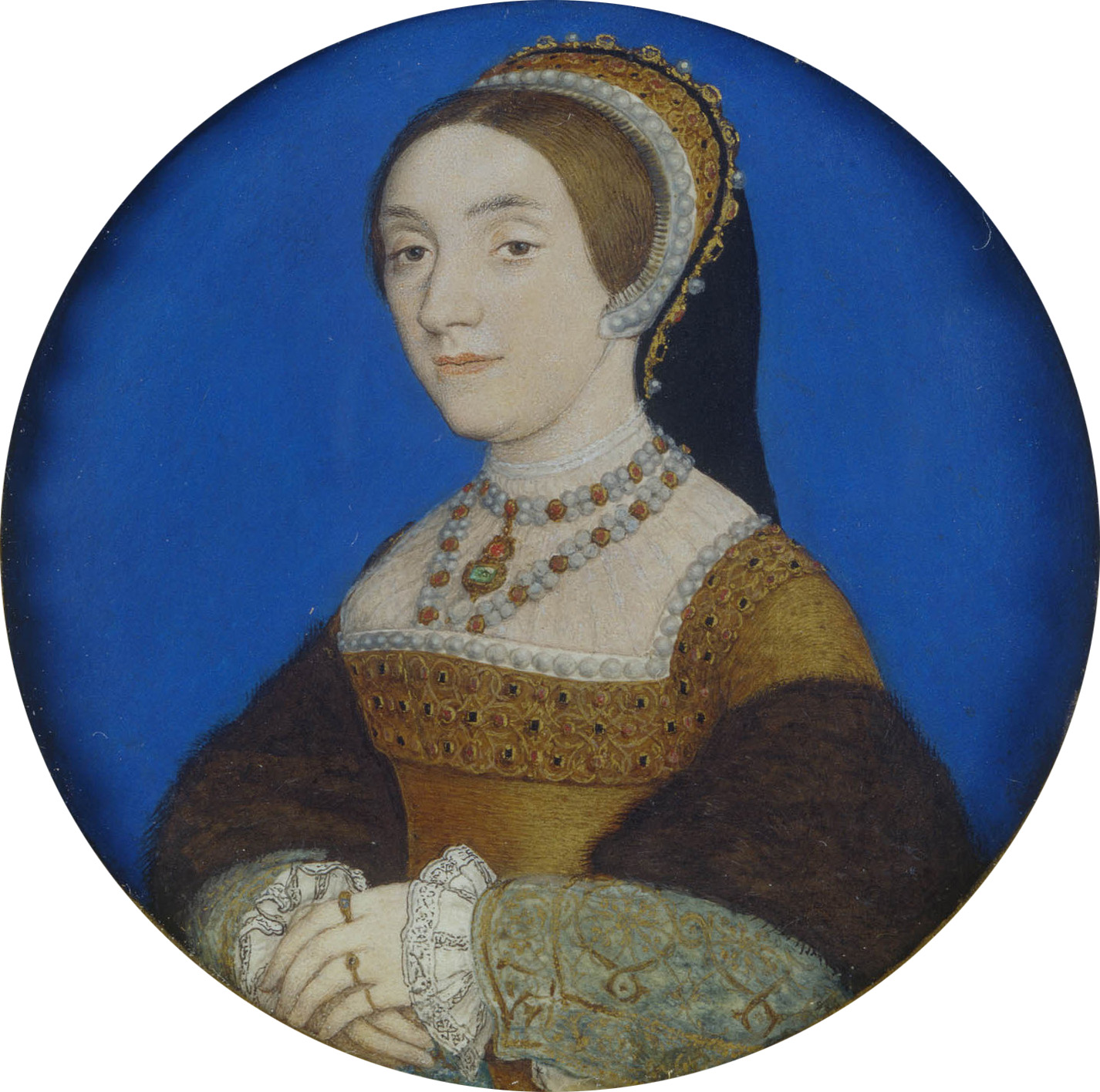
Catherine Howard, The Windsor version of the Holbein miniature

Cromwell was safe only as long as he retained royal favour. However, the King had found his new wife Anne of Cleves particularly unappealing and as she was no longer of any political use he wanted a divorce. Cromwell realised that a divorce would result in a massive loss of face for him as the promoter of the marriage and its associated political machinations and that it could lead not only to his ruin, but also to the end of the Reformation in England. Taking advantage of the King's marital discontent and Thomas Cromwell's hesitation over the divorce, Gardiner and Norfolk together came up with a plan to bring down the Earl of Essex. Norfolk used his pretty young niece, Catherine Howard, at court, to distract the King; and while Henry VIII was distracted, he and Gardiner plotted their rival's demise. Stephen Gardiner entertained the King and the girl in his episcopal palace, while their agents were searching for any damning evidence that could be used against Cromwell.

Feeling threatened, after the arrest of Richard Sampson, Bishop of Chichester, Gardiner and Norfolk decided to make a preemptive strike. "Cromwell was accused of the sacramentarian heresy, or denial of the real presence. The charge with its overtones of anabaptism and anarchy, temporarily overbalanced Henry" and with the deposition by Thomas Wriothesley that implied Cromwell was stalling over the divorce, the King was persuaded to order Cromwell's arrest. Henry was made to see his chief minister as an obstacle to Anne's removal and replacement by Catherine. Gardiner was more than happy to provide the King with the means to a speedy divorce and "false knaves", Richard Rich and Michael Throgmorton were easily procured to make further allegations to the King about the Earl of Essex."

=== Arrest ===
Thomas Cromwell was arrested suddenly at a council meeting at 3.00 p.m. on the afternoon of 10 June 1540, on trumped-up charges of treason and heresy, taken to the Tower of London and his possessions seized.

The French Ambassador Charles de Marillac described his arrest in the Council Chamber at Westminster.

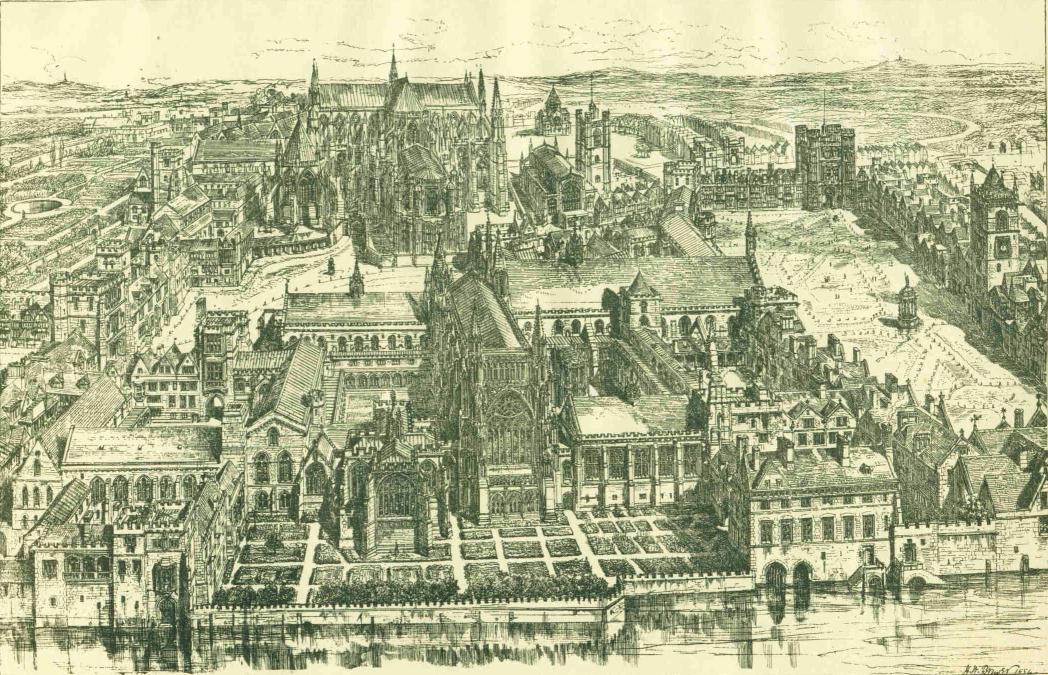
Palace of Westminster in the time of Henry VIII

As soon as the Captain of the Guard declared his charge to make him prisoner, Cromwell in a rage cast his bonnet on the ground, saying to the Duke of Norfolk and others of the Privy Council assembled there that this was the reward of his services, and that he appealed to their consciences as to whether he was a traitor; but since he was treated thus he renounced all pardon, as he had never thought to have offended, and only asked the King not to make him languish long. Thereupon some said he was a traitor, others that he should be judged according to the laws he had made, which were so sanguinary that often words spoken inadvertently with good intention had been constituted high treason. The Duke of Norfolk having reproached him with some "villennyes" done by him, snatched off the order of St George which he bore on his neck, and the Lord High Admiral, to show himself as great an enemy in adversity as he had been thought a friend in prosperity, untied the Garter. Then, by a door which opens upon the water, he was put in a boat and taken to the Tower without the people of this town suspecting it until they saw all the King's archers under Mr. Cheyney at the door of the prisoner's house, where they made an inventory of his goods.

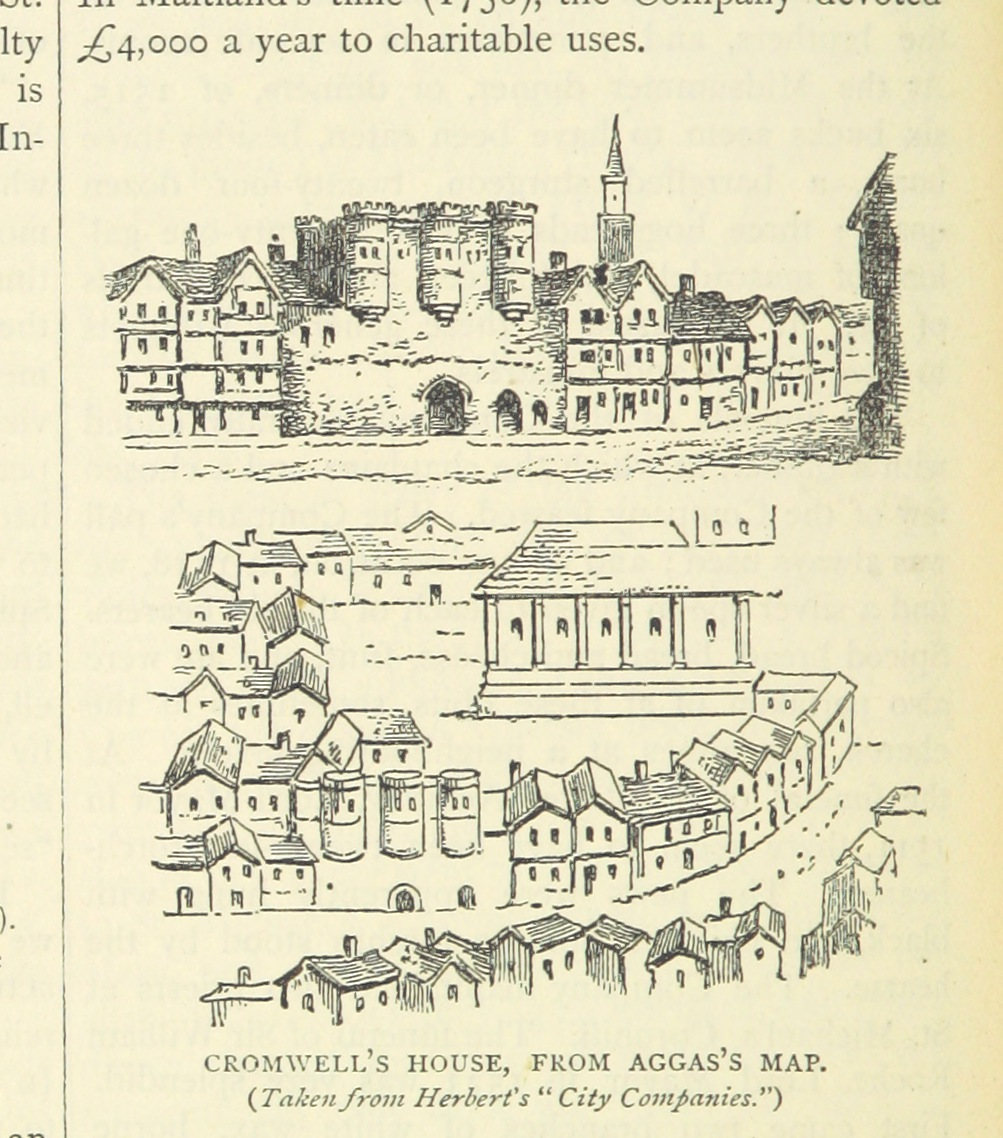
Cromwell's House, illustration in G.W. Thornbury's Old and New London (1887).

According to the sixteenth-century chronicler Edward Hall, those who genuinely mourned Cromwell's arrest were far outnumbered by those who rejoiced. Cromwell, who was courageous enough to implement radical changes in an inherently conservative society like England, was by no means a popular man. Marillac, reporting the news of Cromwell's arrest to Francis I, wrote that "considering that public affairs thereby entirely change their course, especially as regards the innovations in religion of which Cromwell was principal author, the news seems of such importance that it ought to be written forthwith" and in another letter to Anne de Montmorency noted "the division among this King's ministers, who are trying to destroy each other. Cromwell's party seemed the strongest lately by the taking of the dean of the Chapel, bp. of Chichester, but it seems quite overthrown by the taking of the said lord Cromwell, who was chief of his band, and there remain only on his side the abp. of Canterbury, who dare not open his mouth, and the lord Admiral, who has long learnt to bend to all winds, and they have for open enemies the duke of Norfolk and the others. The thing is the more marvellous as it was unexpected by everyone."

Gregory would have been nearby, in the House of Commons, at Westminster, when his father was arrested and might have sent word to his wife Elizabeth, who was at court attending Queen Anne. He and his wife found themselves in a very vulnerable position, and were faced with the possibility of their own arrest. Having been dependants of Thomas Cromwell, they found themselves homeless—all Cromwell's houses, lands, money, and goods were seized by the King (Leeds Castle was soon in the hands of Sir Anthony St Leger)—and, no doubt, in dire financial straits. It is highly probable that Elizabeth's brother, Edward Seymour, then Earl of Hertford, interceded with the king on the couple's behalf, gave them advice, and provided them with a place to live, and that Sir Ralph Sadler was secretly sending news to Gregory about his father.

Gregory's marriage to Elizabeth—the sister of the late Queen Jane and his connection to Edward Seymour, Earl of Hertford, now a favourite of Henry VIII—may have afforded him a degree of protection from the King's wrath. There is no record of Gregory or his wife being questioned in relation to Thomas Cromwell's arrest.

=== Prisoner in the Tower ===
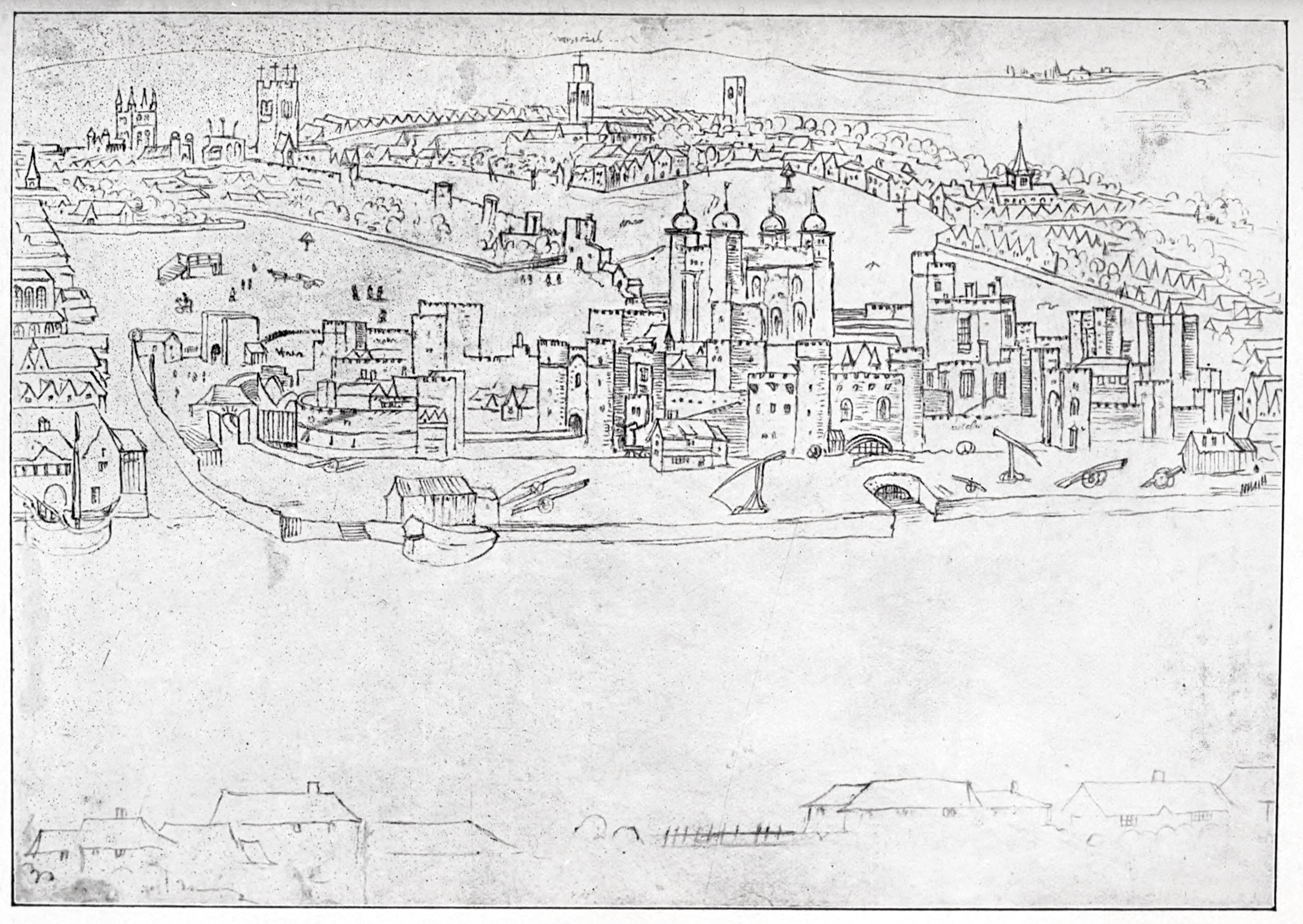
View of London – The Tower of London circa 1554–57, drawn by Anton van den Wyngaerde

The case against Thomas Cromwell was weak; it was well known that Cromwell favoured religious reform, though he had not proceeded any further with his programme of reforms than the King would allow, and his every act had been authorised by the King. Cromwell had not broken any laws, contravened any statutes or disobeyed any royal proclamations. Therefore, he was condemned without a trial and his sentence was later confirmed by an act of attainder. There are no surviving records of Gregory and Elizabeth's movements at this time.

From the day of Thomas Cromwell's arrest until 16 June, during which time he was formally questioned by Norfolk and Thomas Audeley, he gave written answers to questions and wrote detailed letters at the King's command, there was still a faint hope of a reprieve. However, on 17 June, the bill of attainder was heard in Parliament for the first time and Cromwell would have known his terrible fate. Ominously, on a deposition to the King, he wrote "All these articles be tr[ue by the] death I shall die, and m[ore] as more plainly app[eareth by a] letter written with my [own hand] sent by Mr. Secretary [unto] the King's Highness."

Thomas Cromwell wrote a desperate letter from the Tower to the King to plead his innocence and appeal to him to be merciful to his son and the rest of his family.

"Sir, upon [my kne]es I most humbly beseech your most gracious Majesty [to be goo]d and gracious lord to my poor son, the good and virtu[ous lady his] wife, and their poor children"

According to John Foxe, Ralph Sadler alone dared to carry to the King his letter pleading for mercy.

From this Letter we learn that Henry VIII sent Cromwell money while in the Tower and it appears to have given him more than a hope of life. Moreover, Thomas Cromwell was granted the extraordinary 'privilege' of being told of the charges against him and who his accusers were. When Thomas Howard, 3rd Duke of Norfolk was himself arrested in 1546, he "prayed the lords to intercede with the king, that his accusers might be brought face to face, to say what they had against him; and he did not doubt but it should appear he was falsely accused. He desired to have no more favour than Cromwell had, he himself being present when Cromwell was examined." He added that Cromwell "desired, if he might not see his accusers, that he might at least know what the matters were; and if he did not answer truly to every point, he desired not to live an hour longer. He had always been pursued by great enemies about the king; so that his fidelity was tried like gold."

On 29 June, the act of attainder was passed in both houses of parliament and Thomas Cromwell's fate was sealed. It is not known whether Gregory Cromwell was present in the House of Commons during the proceedings against his father.

In July 1540, fearing for her family's future security, Elizabeth wrote the following letter of submission to Henry VIII:

"After the bounden duty of my most humble submission unto your excellent majesty, whereas it hath pleased the same, of your mere mercy and infinite goodness, notwithstanding the heinous trespasses and most grievous offences of my father-in-law, yet so graciously to extend your benign pity towards my poor husband and me, as the extreme indigence and poverty wherewith my said father-in-law's most detestable offences hath oppressed us, is thereby right much holpen and relieved, like as I have of long time been right desirous presently as well to render most humble thanks, as also to desire continuance of the same your highness' most benign goodness. So, considering your grace's most high and weighty affairs at this present, fear of molesting or being troublesome unto your highness hath dissuaded me as yet otherwise to sue unto your grace than alonely by these my most humble letters, until your grace's said affairs shall be partly overpast. Most humbly beseeching your majesty in the mean season mercifully to accept this my most obedient suit, and to extend your accustomed pity and gracious goodness towards my said poor husband and me, who never hath, nor, God willing, never shall offend your majesty, but continually pray for the prosperous estate of the same long time to remain and continue."

This undated letter is placed at the end of July 1540 in Letters and Papers of the Reign of Henry VIII. It is possible that it was written while Thomas Cromwell was imprisoned in the Tower, as Elizabeth refers to her father-in-law, and not her late father-in-law. Moreover, it was customary at that time to write "may his soul God pardon" or something similar when referring to someone who had recently died, which she did not do. The letter may have been written on the advice of her brother or at the King's command. The King was inclined to be generous and Elizabeth was to be included in the future Queen Catherine Howard's household as one of her attendant ladies.

Richard Hilles, a merchant, wrote in a letter dated 28 February 1541, "some think it was a like artifice in the King to confer his title and many of his domains while he was yet in prison upon his son Gregory, who was almost a fool, in order that he might the more readily confess his offences at execution."

There is absolutely no evidence that Gregory was a fool, and much to prove that he was intelligent and accomplished. Moreover, Gregory Cromwell was not created Baron Cromwell by letters patent until December 1540 and did not receive any royal grants before February 1541. His courtesy title of Lord Cromwell was forfeit after his father's arrest, although he did continue to receive the profits from the property alienated to his use and his heirs by his father in November 1538. This property included the manors and lordships of Oakham and Langham (Rutland), Clapthorne, Hackleton and Piddington (Northamptonshire), and Blaston (Leicestershire), with the advowson of Blaston church, and the manors of North Elmham and Beetley (Norfolk). Gregory was still receiving the profits from Langham in April 1541, his entitlement was then being questioned and which was later resolved in his favour.

Hilles' comments can be dismissed as unsubstantiated gossip, although there is always the possibility that the mercurial Henry VIII promised Cromwell, while he was in the Tower, to be a "good and gracious lord" to his son.

=== Death of Thomas Cromwell ===
Cromwell's letter had moved the King, who had asked for it to be read to him three times. However, it was not enough to save his life. Thomas Cromwell was beheaded on Tower Hill on 28 July 1540. Since Thomas was attainted, Gregory could not succeed his father as Earl of Essex and Baron Cromwell (of Wimbledon in the County of Surrey).

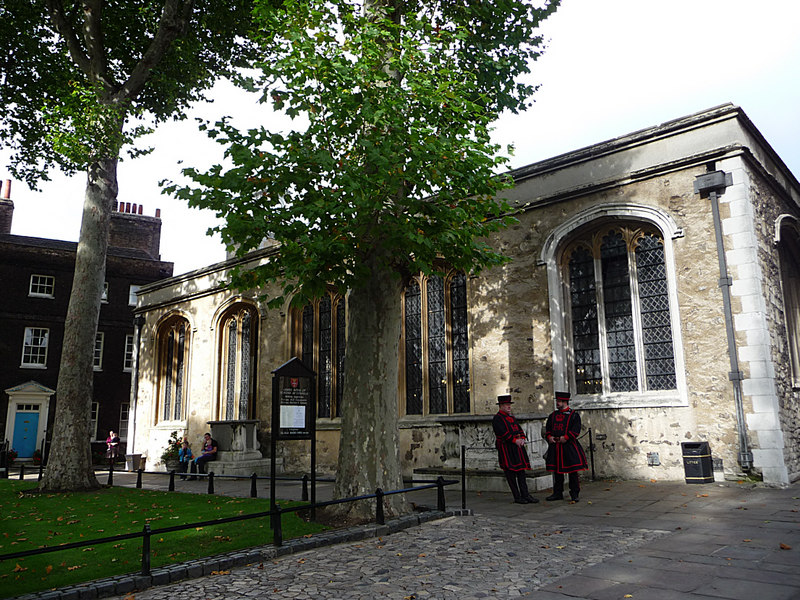
The Church of St Peter ad Vincula inside the Tower of London

Gregory and Elizabeth were not implicated, although it took many months before their desperate situation was to be resolved. Their lives were still in danger from an increasingly paranoid king. It is unknown if Gregory and his family were present at Thomas Cromwell's execution or if permission was given by the King to bury his beloved father with dignity, as Sir Thomas More's family had, under the floor in the Chapel of St Peter ad Vincula in the Tower.

Among those who genuinely mourned Thomas Cromwell, besides Gregory and his family, were his protégés and close friends: Sir Ralph Sadler had lived in Cromwell's household as a boy, was educated by him and had known Gregory Cromwell since he was born. Thomas Cromwell was godfather to Sadler's first two sons. It was Sadler who managed to acquire Holbein's portrait of Thomas Cromwell and keep it hidden during the remaining years of the reign of Henry VIII.

The poet Sir Thomas Wyatt penned an eloquent lamentation of his personal loss. The sonnet speaks of a man who was not only his patron, but his friend, and confidant.

The pillar perish'd is whereto I leant,
The strongest stay of my unquiet mind;
The like of it no man again can find,
From east to west still seeking though he went,
To mine unhap. For hap away hath rent
Of all my joy the very bark and rind:
And I, alas, by chance am thus assign'd
Daily to mourn, till death do it relent.
But since that thus it is by destiny,
What can I more but have a woful heart;
My pen in plaint, my voice in careful cry,
My mind in woe, my body full of smart;
And I myself, myself always to hate,
Till dreadful death do ease my doleful state.

Sir Thomas Wyatt

=== Aftermath ===
At the time of his arrest in 1540, Thomas Cromwell was one of the wealthiest landowners in England. This was "the end result of an active decade buying and selling lands, augmented by large monastic and other royal grants". Gregory as his sole heir should have inherited a vast fortune. Instead, over the next few years his father's lands and property were distributed by the King to others. Gregory Cromwell, his wife and their children faced an uncertain future.

For several months after Thomas Cromwell's execution, Henry VIII remained convinced of his late chief minister's guilt and anyone who had been closely associated with the late Earl of Essex was regarded with suspicion and closely watched. Tensions within the court were running high.

Matters came to a head on the evening of 17 January 1541, when Ambassadors Eustace Chapuys and Charles de Marillac reported to their masters that Sir Thomas Wyatt, Sir Ralph Sadler and unnamed others had been arrested. The following morning, they were taken from Hampton Court, with their hands bound, and accompanied by 24 archers, to the Tower. Marillac wrote to Montmorency that Thomas Wyatt "was led to the Tower so bound and fettered that one must think ill, for the custom is to lead them to prison free" noting that it "must be some great matter for he has for enemies all who leagued against Cromwell, whose minion he was."

Sir Ralph Sadler was able to clear himself and was released in a few days. Sir Thomas Wyatt was set free the following March, at the request of Queen Catherine Howard. Sadler must have provided some very persuasive evidence to his interrogators in the Tower, sufficient not only to secure his own release, but enough to convince the King to question his late chief minister's fate.

The French ambassador, Marillac was to write to Montmorency on 3 March 1541 that Henry VIII had reproached his ministers for Cromwell's death, "saying that, upon light pretexts, by false accusations, they made him put to death the most faithful servant he ever had". It appears that Henry VIII no longer considered Thomas Cromwell to have been guilty of the charges against him, that he had been misled by his councillors and now regretted the loss of an able minister.

== Peerage and knighthood ==
On 18 December 1540, less than five months after his father's execution, Gregory Cromwell was created Baron Cromwell by letters patent, and summoned to Parliament as a peer of the realm. This title was a new creation, rather than a restoration of his father's forfeited barony. The arms he adopted were: quarterly, per fess, indented, azure and or, four lions passant counterchanged and his motto, "Faire mon devoir" (do my duty).

He was now Lord Cromwell, 1st Baron Cromwell in his own right. When Thomas Cromwell was created Earl of Essex on 17 April 1540, his son, Gregory had assumed the courtesy title of Lord Cromwell from his father's secondary title, Lord Cromwell, 1st Baron Cromwell (of Wimbledon in the County of Surrey). Gregory Cromwell was never created Baron Cromwell (of Wimbledon in the County of Surrey) in his own right and only held the courtesy title for a few weeks until his father's arrest and subsequent attainder, when the title was forfeited.

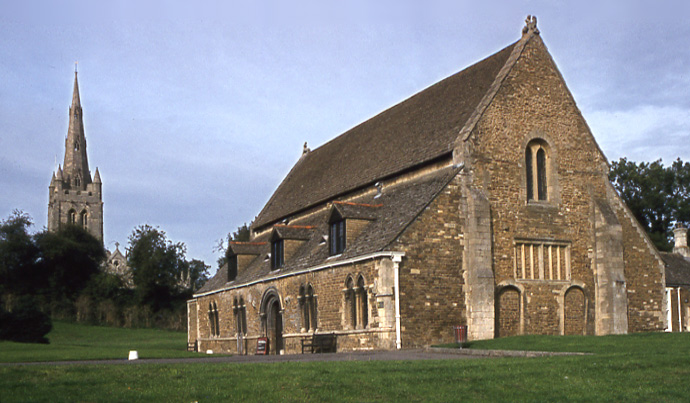
The Great Hall of Oakham Castle

Henry VIII granted Oakham to Thomas Cromwell in July 1538 under the old title of the castle, lordship and manor, yet the grant seems to have referred only to the manor of Oakham with certain judicial rights in the soke and not to the dependent manors and fees of the barony. In November 1538 the manor was settled on Gregory and his wife Elizabeth, to hold for their lives, with remainder to their son, Henry. In this way it escaped forfeiture at the time of Thomas Cromwell's attainder and execution, and was held by his descendants. The following February Gregory received a royal grant of lands that had been owned by his late father. The grant included the house and site of the former priory of Launde, in Launde and Loddington, Leicestershire and lands specified in Loddington, Tilton on the Hill, and Launde as well as "lands enclosed within the said site, called 'Whadborowgh' or 'Wateborogh', belonging to the late monastery of St. James near Northampton", and a water-mill in Launde, the manor of Loddington, parcel of the possessions of the said late priory and also the rectory and advowson of the vicarage of Loddington.

Launde Abbey in Leicestershire was to become the main family estate. It is a manor house built on the site of an Augustinian Priory founded in 1119. Thomas Cromwell had bought Launde Abbey for £1500 but did not live to take up residence. Gregory completed the building of the manor house on the site of the priory and lived there with his family from 1541 until his death in 1551.

Gregory Cromwell was created a Knight of the Bath at the coronation of Edward VI, on 20 February 1547.

== Later years ==
Gregory Cromwell managed to avoid the pitfalls of the Tudor nobility. He did not participate in court politics and for the last ten years of his life he combined managing his estates and shire administration with attendance in the House of Lords where he had an excellent attendance record.

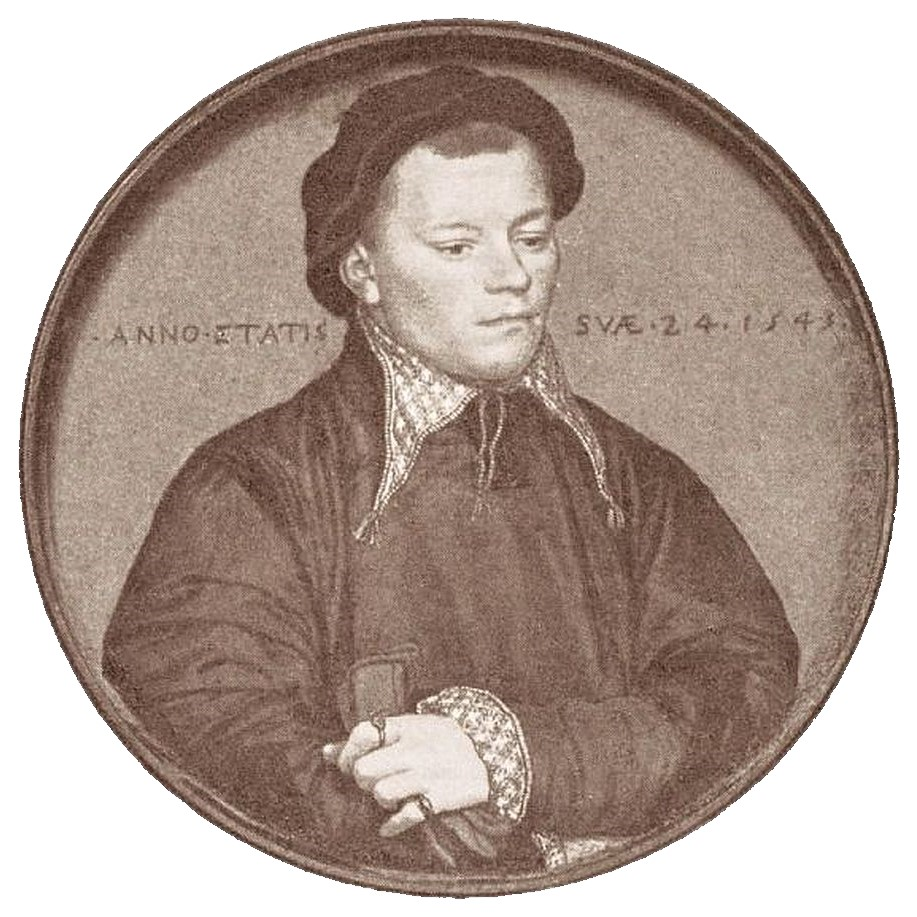
Man aged 24, perhaps Gregory Cromwell (c. 1520- 1551), 1543, Hans Holbein the Younger.

He remained close to his cousin, Sir Richard Cromwell, his former preceptor Henry Dowes, Sir Ralph Sadler and William Cecil, who had been one of the Duke of Somerset's personal secretaries and Master of Requests in the Duke's household. Sir Richard Cromwell died only four years after Thomas Cromwell. Gregory Cromwell had become a very wealthy man, having accumulated vast amounts of land, in addition to the land given to him by his father in 1538, through several royal grants.

In 1541, Gregory received a grant of property in Leicestershire and Northamptonshire of the "house and site, &c., of the late priory of Launde, in Launde and Lodyngton, Leic., and lands specified in Lodyngton, Tylton, and Launde; also lands enclosed within the said site, called "Whadborowgh" or "Wateborogh," belonging to the late monastery of St. James near Northampton, a water-mill in Launde, and the manor of Lodyngton, parcel of the possessions of the said late priory; also the rectory and advowson of the vicarage of Lodyngton."

In Rutland, Gregory held the castle and the Manor of Oakham, the Manor of Langham, two windmills, three other mills, sixty messuages, twenty cottages with their appurtenances in Oakham, Langham and Flitteris, of the King in Capite, by Knights Service in Fee. Also, the Manor of Lyddington, and land belonging to the late chantry at Manton, with their appurtenances in Lyddington, Belton and Wardley, Stoke Dry, and Snelston, with the advowson of Wardley, of the King, by the rent of 14l 3 s 5 d ob. per annum for all services as appeared by Letters Patents granted by Edward VI. This last-mentioned estate was for the lives of himself and Elizabeth his wife.

In addition, from 1538, he owned the manors of Clapthorne, Piddington and Hackleton in Northamptonshire as well as the manors of North Elmham and Beetley in Norfolk,and from 1545, held the lease of a moiety of the manor of Rompney in the lordship of Newport, South Wales in survivorship (formerly granted to his father.)

Though not very long, Gregory Cromwell's life was eventful. He lived through the last turbulent years of Henry VIII's reign, saw his queens and courtiers come and go, he survived the execution of his father, witnessed epidemics of plague and sweating sickness take away his friends and relations and lived through much political, social and religious upheaval. Although his exemption from attending the King in the war in France in 1544 might suggest illness or injury, he appears to have made a full recovery.

During his time in the House of Lords, he participated in several high-profile proceedings, notably, the attainders of Queen Catherine Howard on 8 February 1542, as well as Henry Howard, Earl of Surrey and Thomas Howard, 3rd Duke of Norfolk, in January 1547. In 1547 he participated in the funeral of Henry VIII, as one of the lords carrying the canopy over the late King's coffin. On 28 February 1549 he was present in the House of Lords when the bill of attainder was passed on his wife's brother Thomas Seymour and again in January 1550 during proceedings against his brother-in-law and patron Edward Seymour, Duke of Somerset.

== Death and succession ==
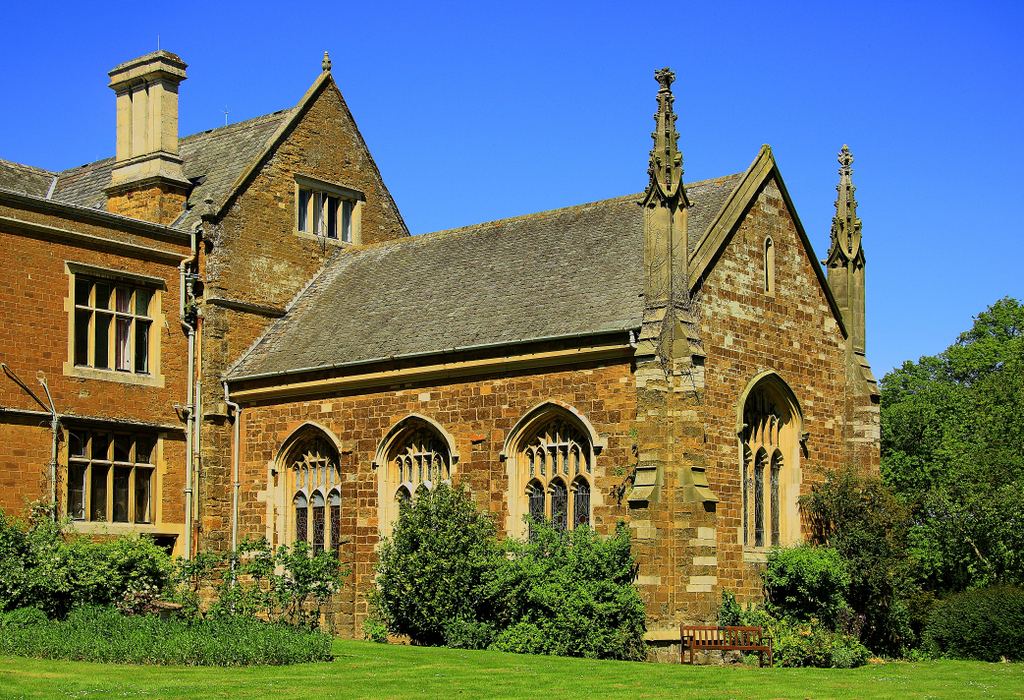
Launde Abbey Chapel

Gregory Cromwell died of sweating sickness on 4 July 1551 at his home, Launde Abbey, Leicestershire, and on 7 July 1551 was buried in a magnificent tomb in the chapel there. His wife was also ill but survived. He was succeeded by his eldest son, Henry. Henry's grandson, Thomas, 4th Baron Cromwell, later 1st Viscount Lecale, was created Earl of Ardglass in the peerage of Ireland on 15 April 1645. The Barony of Cromwell was held by the 1st Viscount Lecale from 22 November 1624 and by the Earls of Ardglass from 15 April 1645 until 26 November 1687, when, on the death of Vere Essex Cromwell, 4th Earl of Ardglass and 7th Baron Cromwell, both titles became extinct. Lady Cromwell subsequently married, between 10 March and 24 April 1554, Sir John Paulet, later Lord St. John, eldest son of Sir William Paulet, 1st Marquess of Winchester. She died 19 March 1568, and was buried 5 April in St Mary's Church, Basing, Hampshire.

== In culture ==
Gregory Cromwell was played by actor Jack West in the Season 3 finale of Showtime cable television show The Tudors. In Wolf Hall, a novel by Hilary Mantel, which offers a sympathetic portrayal of the rise of Thomas Cromwell, Gregory is depicted as a childlike, slightly inept but lovable young man.

In Bring Up the Bodies, Mantel's acclaimed sequel to Wolf Hall, the portrayal is of a young man coming of age with confidence – still naïve, but with potential; he is played in the BBC television adaptation by Tom Holland. In the stage production of Wolf Hall Part Two, Gregory (played by Benedict Hastings) is an intelligent young man who understands why his father is sometimes ruthless but is still young enough to be horrified by his father's actions, especially the disposal of Anne Boleyn's "lovers". Charlie Rowe played Gregory Cromwell in Wolf Hall: The Mirror and the Light.

== Notes ==
Peerage of England
New creation	Baron Cromwell; 1540–1551	Succeeded by Henry Cromwell
