= Launde Priory =

Augustinian priory in Leicestershire, England

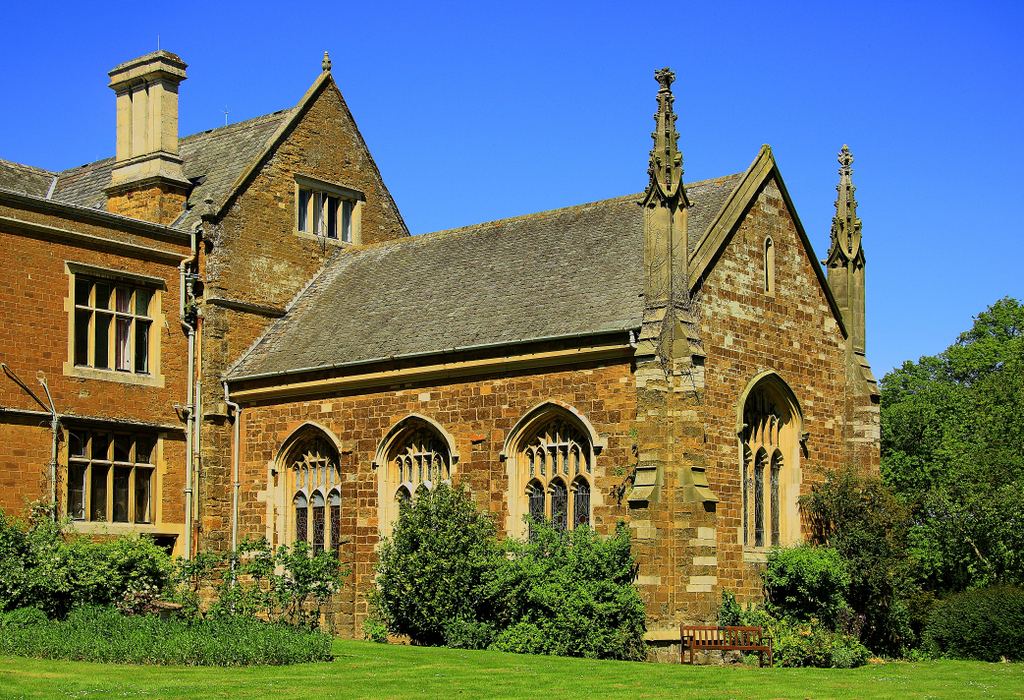
- The remains of Laude Priory were incorporated into the chapel of the newly constructed manor house known as Launde Abbey

- Location within Leicestershire
- Interactive map of Launde Priory

Monastery information
- Order: Augustinian Canons Regular
- Established: c.1119
- Disestablished: 1538
- Dedication: St John the Baptist
- Diocese: Lincoln

People
- Founders: Richard and Maud Basset

Site
- Coordinates: 52.630971°N 0.82371°W
- Visible remains: Incorporated into the chapel of Launde Abbey Manor House.

Launde Priory is a former Augustinian priory in Leicestershire, England. Its successor Launde Abbey is used as a conference and retreat centre by the Church of England dioceses of Leicester and Peterborough.

== History ==
Launde Priory was founded c.1119 by Richard Basset and his wife, Maude, who endowed the priory with the advowsons of the churches of Ab Kettleby, Frisby on the Wreake, Holt, Oadby, Welham and Witherley, all within Leicestershire; Ashby, Weldon and Weston by Welland in Northamptonshire; Hathersage in Derbyshire; Colston Bassett in Nottinghamshire; Wardley in Rutland; and Pattingham in Staffordshire. They also donated the village of Loddington in Leicestershire; this donation probably also included the advowson of Loddington church.

Within 50 years, from other benefactors, Launde also gained the churches of Grimston, Rotherby and Tilton in Leicestershire; Glaston in Rutland. The priory also gained the manor of Frisby-on-the-Wreake in Leicestershire: this was seized by King Henry II although subsequently returned.

Within the next century the priory acquired yet more churches, including Ashby Folville, Shoby and Peatling Parva in Leicestershire, and Arthingworth, Blatherwick and Little Bowden in Northamptonshire.

The priory did not remain in control of all of its possessions, however, and lost many throughout its existence.

In the mid 15th-century, the priory was visited by William Alnwick, Bishop of Lincoln. The visit reveals that the priory was home to 10 canons when previously there had been 18, and that the priory's income had fallen from 1000 marks, to only 400. These problems were attributed to a series of bad priors and an era of bad management. It was a period of decline which would continue until dissolution.

In 1528 the priory was recorded home to the prior, 9 canons and 4 novices. The priory was, however, in poor condition. The refectory was in ruins and the priory church "dilapidated".

Around 1531, Thomas Frisby, a canon of Launde, was a friend of Thomas Cromwell. He wrote to Cromwell reminding him of a visit to Launde Priory when they walked together in the snow from Withcote to Launde. During their walk, Frisby fell over a place called the "Dammes". Frisby sent Cromwell a gift of cheese made nearby.

The Valor Ecclesiasticus of 1535 recorded the priory as having an annual income, after expenses, of around £400. The priory was finally dissolved in December 1539, and the prior was awarded an annual pension of £60. Thomas Cromwell had been interested in the priory's property since 1528, and he ensured the priory was granted to himself following dissolution.

Cromwell built himself a new manor house on top of the former priory site. This house is known as Launde Abbey. Part of the former priory church (part of the crossing of the chancel) were incorporated into a new chapel attached to the new house.

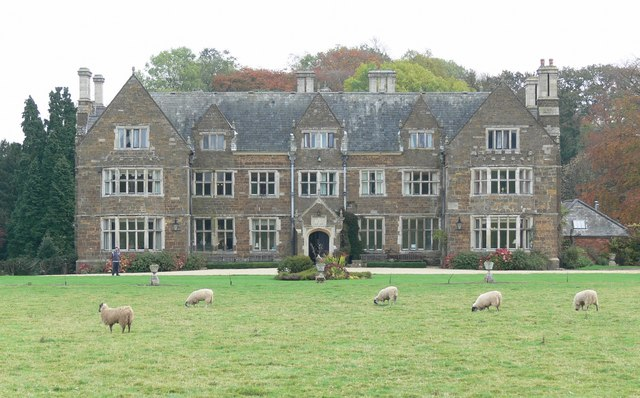
Launde Abbey, the manor house built on the site of the former priory

Gregory Cromwell, 1st Baron Cromwell was buried in that chapel.

=== Priors of Launde Priory ===
A list of the Priors of Launde:

- John, occurs before 1125.
- Ralph, occurs about 1160.
- Walkelin, occurs 1189 and 1201.
- Osbert, occurs 1230.
- Robert, occurs 1236.
- Robert de Martivail, occurs 1240 to 1252.
- Reynold, died 1273.
- Richard de Martivail, elected 1273, died 1289.
- William of Somerby, elected 1289, resigned 1300.
- John of Kirkby, elected 1300, died 1309.
- John de Burgh, elected 1309, died 1319.
- Henry of Braunseton, elected 1319, resigned 1334.
- John of Peatling, elected 1334, died 1350.
- John of Wytherington, elected 1350, resigned 1366.
- John of Leicester, elected 1366, died 1369.
- John of Rearsby, elected 1369, resigned 1376.
- Thomas Colman, elected 1376, deprived or resigned, 1388.
- Walter Baldok, elected 1388, occurs 1395, deprived before 1398.
- John Henriz, occurs 1398.
- Thomas Colman, occurs 1404 to 1416.
- William Northampton, elected 1423, occurs 1440.
- Thomas Myles, occurs 1458.
- Thomas Frisby, occurs 1464 to 1478.
- Robert Northampton, occurs 1482-3.
- John Lancaster, occurs 1509, surrendered the priory 1539.

== Other burials ==
- Thomas Chaworth
- Henry Cromwell, 2nd Baron Cromwell
- Mary Paulet
