= Elizabeth Wyckes =

Wife of Thomas Cromwell (d. 1529)

- Born: Putney
- Died: 1529; Stepney
- Occupations: Wife of Thomas Cromwell, chief minister to Henry VIII
- Spouse(s): Thomas Williams Thomas Cromwell (m. 1515)
- Children: Gregory Cromwell, 1st Baron Cromwell; Anne Cromwell; Grace Cromwell
- Parent(s): Henry Wyckes; Mercy Pryor

Elizabeth Wyckes (also Wykys, or Wykes) (d. 1529) was the wife of Thomas Cromwell (1485 – 28 July 1540), Earl of Essex, and chief minister to Henry VIII of England. She was daughter to Henry Wyckes, a well-to-do clothier from Chertsey, and his wife Mercy, who married Sir John Pryor after Wyckes' death.

== Marriages and issue ==
Elizabeth married as her first husband Thomas Williams, a Yeoman of the Guard. There were no known children from this union.

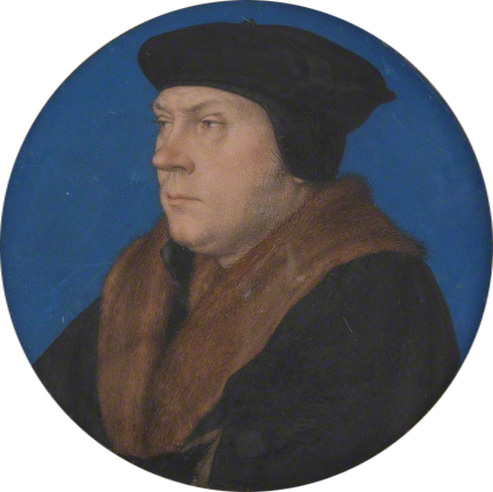
Thomas Cromwell, after Hans Holbein the Younger

Around 1515, Elizabeth remarried, this time to Thomas Cromwell, who had recently returned to England from Antwerp. Together, Thomas and Elizabeth had three surviving children:

- Gregory Cromwell, 1st Baron Cromwell, c. 1520 – 4 July 1551
- Anne Cromwell
- Grace Cromwell

Little is known about Elizabeth Wyckes, or her marriage to Thomas Cromwell; she died early in his career, long before he reached his zenith. During the early years of their marriage, Thomas Cromwell had been a successful merchant and lawyer and there is evidence to suggest that he had taken over the running of Henry Wyckes' business. The home where Elizabeth lived with her husband and mother, and where her children were born, appears to have been both harmonious and prosperous. Cromwell could afford to buy expensive jewellery: "a sapphire ring" and "a gold bracelet with a jacinth worth £80." His friends were merchants and scholars and he and his wife regularly entertained them and corresponded with them. Elizabeth and her mother played their part in this circle of friends. One wrote asking for the good housewife "to send another plaster for his knee" and another desired to be commended "to your mother, after you my most singular good friend." The one surviving letter from Thomas to his wife suggests a normal, happy marriage. He also sent her a doe that he had downed while hunting.

Elizabeth Wykes was the daughter of Henry Wykes of Putney, Surrey, a shearman who later became a gentleman usher to Henry VIII. She and her husband Thomas Cromwell lived in Austin Friars, London. Before her death in Stepney, her husband had attracted the attention of Cardinal Wolsey and was rapidly making a name for himself in court circles. After her death, her mother, by then Mrs. Pryor, lived in Cromwell's house with her second husband for several more years.

== Descendants ==
Elizabeth died early in 1529, of what is believed to be the sweating sickness, and was survived by her three children, her husband, and her mother. Her daughters, Anne and Grace, are believed to have died not long after their mother of the same disease. Thomas Cromwell never remarried. Gregory Cromwell married Elizabeth Seymour, the sister of Jane Seymour and widow of Sir Anthony Ughtred. They had five children:

- Henry Cromwell, 2nd Baron Cromwell, 1538 – 1592
- Edward, 1539 – died young
- Thomas Cromwell, c. 1540 – died between February 1610 and April 1611
- Katherine (or Catherine) Cromwell, c. 1541 –
- Frances Cromwell, c. 1544 – 7 February 1562

== Fictional portrayals ==
Natasha Little portrayed Elizabeth Wyckes (called Liz Cromwell in the credits) in Wolf Hall, six-part TV series first broadcast by BBC Two in early 2015.

== Sources ==
- Ellis, Henry (1846). "Original Letters Illustrative of English History". third series. London: Richard Bentley.
- Fitzgerald, Teri; MacCulloch, Diarmaid (2016). "Gregory Cromwell: two portrait miniatures by Hans Holbein the Younger". The Journal of Ecclesiastical History. 67 (3): 587–601. doi:10.1017/S0022046915003322.
- Gairdner, James (1888). "Cromwell, Thomas (1485?-1540)". In Stephen, Leslie (ed.). Dictionary of National Biography. Vol. 13. London: Smith, Elder & Co. pp. 192–202.
- Hutchinson, Robert (2009). Thomas Cromwell: The Rise and Fall of Henry VIII's Most Notorious Minister. New York: Thomas Dunne Books. ISBN 978-0-312-57794-0.
- "Letters and Papers, Foreign and Domestic, Henry VIII". British-history.ac.uk.
- Merriman, R. B. (1902). Life and Letters of Thomas Cromwell. Vol. I. Oxford: Clarendon Press.
- Richardson, Douglas (2011). Everingham, Kimball G. (ed.). Magna Carta Ancestry: A Study in Colonial and Medieval Families. Vol. II (2nd ed.). Douglas Richardson. ISBN 9781461045205.
- Schofield, John (2011). The Rise & Fall of Thomas Cromwell: Henry VIII's Most Faithful Servant. The History Press. ISBN 9780752458663.
- Wilson, Derek (2003). In the Lion's Court: Power, Ambition, and Sudden Death in the Reign of Henry VIII. New York: Macmillan. ISBN 978-0-312-30277-1.
- Van Dyke, Paul (1906). Renascence Portraits. London: Archibald Constable & Co.
