= Henry Dowes =

English politician (c. 1501–1550)

The Honourable Henry Dowes

Member of Parliament for Maldon
- In office 1542–1544
- Preceded by: William Bonham
- Succeeded by: Nicholas Throckmorton

Member of Parliament for Maldon
- In office 1547–1550
- Preceded by: Nicholas Throckmorton
- Succeeded by: William Bassett

Personal details
- Born: c. 1501
- Died: 16 January 1550 (aged 48–49)
- Parent: John Dawes

Henry Dowes or Dawes (c. 1501 – 16 January 1550) of Maldon, Essex, was an English politician. He was a Member of the Parliament of England (MP) for the seat of Maldon in 1542 and in 1547.

== Family ==
Dowes was born around 1501, the son of a wealthy Maldon merchant, John Dawes and his wife, Beatrice.

His younger brother, William (d. 1565), was vicar of All Hallows Barking from 1542 to 1565 and later rector of All Saints, Maldon from 1551 to 1561 and Rivenhall from 1560 to 1565.

== Career ==
Dowes was a servant of Thomas Cromwell by the mid-1530s, acting as preceptor and mentor to Cromwell's only son, Gregory, from around 1534 to early 1537, supervising his pupil's tuition in Latin, French and other subjects. Two surviving letters from Dowes to Thomas Cromwell, and one to Gregory, show the writer to have been an educated man, although where he received his own education, and how he came to Cromwell’s attention, are unknown. Cambridge may have played a part in both: Gregory Cromwell was at Cambridge in 1528 and Dowes’ brother, William, graduated there in 1532 or 1533.

In a letter written at Chester on 6 September [1534] Dowes reminded Cromwell of the charge given him ″not only to give diligent attendance upon Master Gregory but also to instruct him with good letters, honest manners, pastimes of instruments and such other qualities as should be for him meet and convenient″; he enclosed his own translation of a colloquy by Erasmus: ″Pietas Puerilis″. In another letter of 30 April [1536], written at the home of Richard Southwell at Woodrising in Norfolk he assured Cromwell that this summer shall be consecrated to Apollo and the Muses, as was the last to "the wild goddess Diana."

In the summer and autumn of 1535 Dowes and Gregory Cromwell were at Rycote House in Oxfordshire, the home of a Cromwell cousin, John Williams (later Baron Williams of Thame). They returned to Rycote in 1537 for "an extended working holiday" from January to March.

On 23 May 1539 Dowes was sent to deliver money to Gregory Cromwell's wife, "Lady Owthred″, at Leeds Castle in Kent, for ″apparel for [Mistress] Jane″, Thomas Cromwell's illegitimate daughter, and in early December he accompanied his former pupil to Calais to await the arrival of Henry VIII's fourth wife, Anne of Cleves.

Dowes appears to have maintained his relationship with Gregory Cromwell after ceasing to be his mentor. In March 1540 he sent Gregory a detailed report of a sermon preached by the vicar of Stepney, William Jerome, which had included ″opprobrious words against the burgesses of the Parliament as calling them butterflies, dissemblers and knaves″. In September 1544 Dowes bought the manor of Leigham Court in Streatham, Surrey, formerly belonging to St. Saviour’s, Bermondsey: Gregory Cromwell had earlier taken ″a 99-year lease of this manor and the price of £271 paid by Dowes was equal to 20 years’ purchase on the rent of £15 payable by Cromwell, less outgoings.″ Dowes was described in this transaction as of Launde, Cromwell’s principal residence.

It is unclear under whose patronage Dowes came to sit for Maldon in the Parliaments of 1542 and 1547. ″As the son of a leading townsman he must have been an acceptable candidate, particularly since he undertook not only to serve the borough’s interests in Parliament but to claim no wages, either then, or at any future time, for his services: he was made a freeman by virtue of his election.″ His election may be accounted for by the support of Gregory Cromwell, who after his elevation to the peerage could have seen advantage in having followers in the Commons. Cromwell was, moreover, a brother-in-law of Edward Seymour, 1st Duke of Somerset, as was Dowes’ fellow-MP in 1547, Sir Clement Smith.

== Death ==
He died on 16 January 1550. The inquisition post mortem found his brother, William, then aged 48, to be his heir. William inherited the manor of Leigham Court, part of which he sold in 1559, and the rest in 1561. Dowes was replaced in Parliament by William Bassett.
