= East Norton =

Village in Leicestershire, England

Coordinates: 52.5959°N 0.8427°W

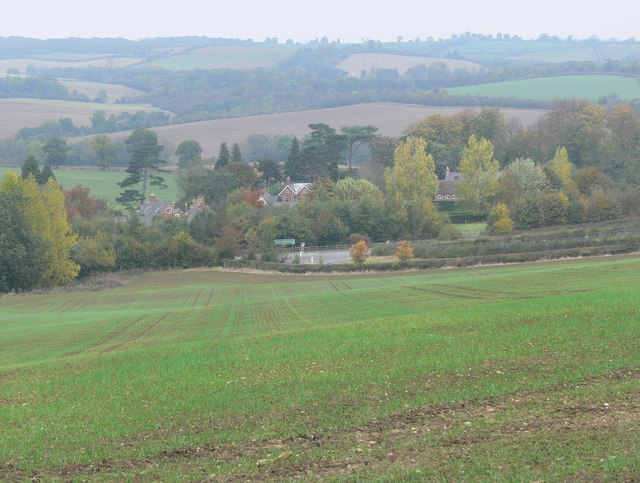

- Location within Leicestershire
- Population: 94 (2001)
- OS grid reference: SK785005
- District: Harborough
- Shire county: Leicestershire
- Region: East Midlands
- Country: England
- Sovereign state: United Kingdom
- Post town: LEICESTER
- Postcode district: LE7
- Dialling code: 0116
- Police: Leicestershire
- Fire: Leicestershire
- Ambulance: East Midlands
- UK Parliament: Rutland and Stamford

East Norton is a small village and parish located in the east of Leicestershire, adjoining the A47 Leicester to Uppingham road. According to the 2001 Census, it had a population of 94 in 37 households. The population remained less than 100 at the 2011 census and details are included in the civil parish of Loddington. East Norton is situated in the Tilton Ward in the Rural East area of the Harborough District, and the Launde Electoral Division of the Leicestershire County Council. Nationally it is in the Rutland and Melton Parliamentary Constituency and the Three Cities Sub-Area of the East Midlands Region.

The village's name means 'northern farm/settlement'.

East Norton is one of the 51 Thankful Villages in England and Wales that suffered no fatalities during the Great War of 1914 to 1918. The village was featured on Darren Hayman's album, Thankful Villages Volume 2.
