= Loddington, Leicestershire =

Village in Leicestershire, England

Coordinates: 52°36′47″N 0°50′07″W

Loddington
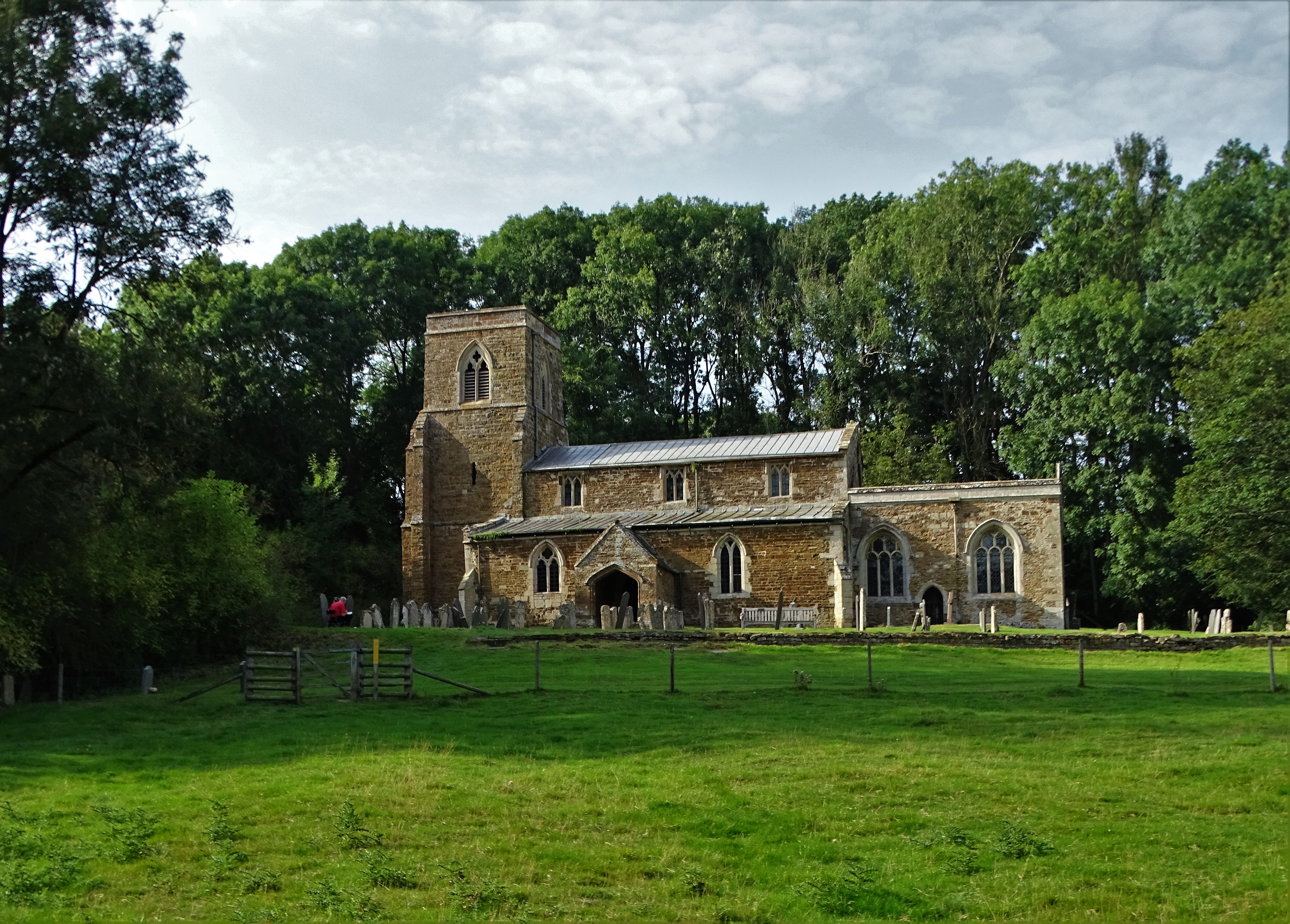
- The parish church of Loddington and Launde, St Michael and All Angels

- Location within Leicestershire
- Population: 77 (2001 Census)
- OS grid reference: SK789023
- Civil parish: Loddington
- District: Harborough
- Shire county: Leicestershire
- Region: East Midlands
- Country: England
- Sovereign state: United Kingdom
- Post town: Leicester
- Postcode district: LE7
- Dialling code: 0116
- Police: Leicestershire
- Fire: Leicestershire
- Ambulance: East Midlands
- UK Parliament: Harborough

Loddington is a village and civil parish in the Harborough district of Leicestershire. It is on the county boundary with Rutland, and the nearest town is Oakham in Rutland, 6 miles (10 km) to the northeast.

Loddington is on a stream that joins Eye Brook, a tributary of the River Welland.

The 2001 Census recorded Loddington's parish population as 77. By the time of the 2011 Census Loddington had been merged with the neighbouring civil parish of Launde. The census included the parish with that of East Norton, for which it recorded a combined total of 230.

== Manor ==
The Domesday Book of 1086 records the toponym as Ludintone, meaning the enclosure, estate or homestead of Luda's people. Later spellings include Ludinton in 1125, Ludington in 1248 and Lodington in 1209–35.

In 1125 Richard Basset and his wife granted the manor of Loddington to the Augustinian Launde Priory as part of its founding endowment.

After the Dissolution of the Monasteries the manor passed to Thomas Cromwell and then his son Gregory Cromwell, 1st Baron Cromwell. In the 17th century Sir John Pretyman, 1st Baronet held the manor. He sold it to the Morris family, who held it for several generations.

Loddington Hall is the manor house. The earliest surviving record of it is from 1475. The oldest parts of the present house are late 16th-century, but most of the building is later 17th-century. It is a Grade II* listed building.

In the 1900s Sholto Charles Douglas, Lord Aberdour (later Earl of Morton) acquired the house as a hunting lodge. From 1934 to 1984 the Allerton family owned it. In the Second World War the house was requisitioned by use by paratroops, after which it was occupied by the evacuated Cone Ripman Dance School. In 1984 Lady Allerton sold the derelict building, and it has since been renovated as a family home.

The Game & Wildlife Conservation Trust has a base at Loddington House, on the Loddington estate, where it has run the Allerton Project since 1992 to demonstrate the integration of game and wildlife conservation with profitable farming.

== Parish church ==
The earliest part of the Church of England parish church of St Michael and All Angels is the Norman south doorway, which is almost certainly 12th-century. But the church was largely rebuilt late in the 13th or early in the 14th century. Later in the Middle Ages a Perpendicular Gothic clerestory was added to the nave. Fragments of Medieval stained glass survive in one window of the chancel. The pulpit is Jacobean. The church is a Grade II* listed building.

The west tower has three bells. Johannes de Stafford of Leicester cast the treble bell in about 1400. Hugh I Watts cast the second bell in 1602. Thomas I Eayre of Kettering, Northamptonshire cast the tenor bell in 1737. For technical reasons the bells are currently unringable.

== Railway ==
In 1879 the Great Northern and London and North Western Joint Railway was built through the parish, linking Market Harborough with Newark and Nottingham. The nearest station was at East Norton, about 1 mile (1.6 km) south of Loddington. British Railways closed East Norton station in 1953 and the railway in 1964.

== Bibliography ==
- Ekwall, Eilert (1960) [1936]. Concise Oxford Dictionary of English Place-Names (4th ed.). Oxford: Oxford University Press. Loddington. ISBN 0198691033.
- Hoskins, W. G, (ed.); McKinley, R. A. (1954). "Houses of Augustinian canons: The priory of Launde". A History of the County of Leicestershire. Victoria County History. Vol. II. London: Oxford University Press for the University of London Institute of Historical Research. pp. 10–13.
- Pevsner, Nikolaus; Williamson, Elizabeth; Brandwood, Geoffrey (1984) [1960]. Leicestershire and Rutland. The Buildings of England. Harmondsworth: Penguin Books. pp. 277–278. ISBN 0-14-071018-3.
