= Thomas Cromwell (Parliamentary diarist) =

English Member of Parliament

The Honourable Thomas Cromwell
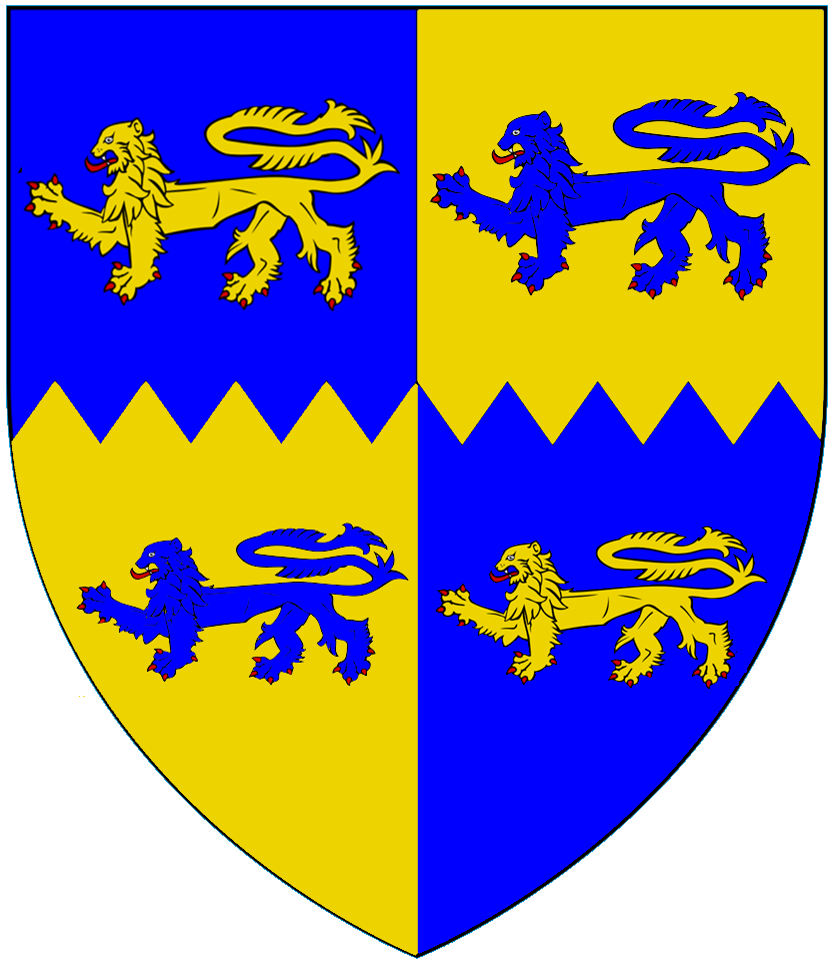
- Arms of Cromwell: Quarterly, per fess, indented, azure and or, four lions passant counterchanged
- Born: c. 1540
- Died: c. 1611 (aged 70–71); King's Lynn, Norfolk, England
- Occupation: MP
- Spouse: Katherine Gardner
- Children: Henry Cromwell; Humfrey Cromwell; Lyonell Cromwell; Thomas Cromwell; Gregory Cromwell; Ann Cromwell; Susan Cromwell; Katherine Cromwell; Mary Cromwell
- Parents: Gregory Cromwell, 1st Baron Cromwell; Elizabeth Seymour

Thomas Cromwell (c. 1540 – c. 1611) was an English Member of Parliament during the reign of Queen Elizabeth I. His diaries of proceedings in the House of Commons are an important source for historians of parliamentary history during the period when he was a member, and Sir John Neale draws heavily upon them in his ground-breaking two-volume study of Elizabeth I and Her Parliaments (1953–1957).

== Family ==
Thomas Cromwell was the third son of Gregory Cromwell, 1st Baron Cromwell and Elizabeth Seymour, sister to Jane Seymour, third wife of Henry VIII. He was the grandson of statesman Thomas Cromwell, 1st Earl of Essex, chief minister to Henry VIII. Born in around 1540, he was educated at St John's College, Cambridge where he matriculated in 1553.

== Career ==
Cromwell sat in five successive Parliaments between 1571 and 1589 during the reign of Queen Elizabeth I: for Fowey (1571), Bodmin (1572–1581), Preston (1584–1585) and Grampound (1586-7 and 1589). Gregory Cromwell had been a friend of Sir William Cecil and it may have been Cecil who found Thomas Cromwell his seats at Fowey, Bodmin and Grampound. His return at Preston in 1584 may be accounted for by the patronage of Sir Ralph Sadler, chancellor of the Duchy of Lancaster, who was brought up in the household of Cromwell's grandfather. He served on numerous Parliamentary committees and, by the end of his career, seems to have been one of the most respected of the independent members and recognised as an authority on Parliamentary procedure. His sympathies were with the Puritan party in the House, but he was considered a moderate. Neale described him as the model type of parliamentarian, deeply versed in the history and procedure of the institution, though lacking in historical perspective; eminently responsible, but fearless in defence of liberty. He was a puritan but his zeal did not cloud his judgment which, with his knowledge of procedure, rendered him one of the most experienced committeemen of his time.

== Marriage and issue ==
Thomas Cromwell married, on 18 August 1580, Katherine (died before 1 August 1616), daughter of Thomas Gardner of Coxford, and by her had 5 sons and 4 daughters.

- Henry Cromwell (c. 14 March 1583 – before 9 December 1629)
- Humfrey Cromwell (c. 23 June 1586 – )
- Lyonell Cromwell (c. 8 Jan. 1591 – )
- Thomas Cromwell
- Gregory Cromwell
- Ann Cromwell (c. 22 August 1587 – )
- Susan Cromwell (c. 17 May 1590 – )
- Katherine Cromwell
- Mary Cromwell

== Death ==
After retiring from Parliament, Cromwell resided at King's Lynn, Norfolk, making his will on 17 February 1610. Cromwell requested that no "pomp or sumptuousness" be used at his funeral, "being not willing to have vanities continued for me after my death, whereto I have been too much subject in my lifetime." He died between February 1610 and April 1611, leaving money and property to his wife "who has always been a most loving wife... and hath besides endured many griefs and sorrows for my sake", to his children, subject to their good behaviour and money to the poor of Great Risborough, Norfolk, and to the poor of the parish where he died.

== Bibliography ==
- Carthew, G. A. (1878). The Hundred of Launditch and Deanery of Brisley; in the County of Norfolk; Evidences and Topographical Notes from public records, Heralds' Visitations, Wills, Court Rolls, Old Charters, Parish Registers, Town books, and Other Private Sources; Digested and Arranged as Materials for Parochial, Manorial, and Family History. Vol. II. Collected by G.A. Carthew. Norwich: Printed by Miller and Leavins.
- Dean, David M. "Cromwell, Thomas (c. 1540-1610/1611), parliamentary diarist". Oxford Dictionary of National Biography (online ed.). Oxford University Press. doi:10.1093/ref:odnb/60713. (Subscription, Wikipedia Library access or UK public library membership required.)
- Metcalfe, Walter C. (1885). A Book of Knights Banneret, Knights of the Bath, and Knights Bachelor. London: Mitchell and Hughes.
- N. M. S. (1981). "Cromwell, Thomas (c.1540–c.1611), of king's Lynn, Norf.". In Hasler, P. W. (ed.). Members. The History of Parliament: the House of Commons 1558–1603. Historyofparliamentonline.org.
- Neale, J. E. (1953). Elizabeth I and Her Parliaments 1559-1581. London: Jonathan Cape.
- Neale, J. E. (1957). Elizabeth I and Her Parliaments 1584-1601. London: Jonathan Cape.
- Noble, Mark (1784). Memoirs of Several Persons and Families Who, by Females are Allied to, or Descended from the Protectorate-House of Cromwell. Birmingham: Pearson and Rollason. p. 8.
- Rye, Walter (1891). The Vicitation of Norfolk made and taken by William Hervey, Clarenceux, King of Arms, Anno 1563, Enlarged with Another Visitacion made by Clarenceux Cooke, with Many Other Descents; and also the Vissitation Made by John Raven, Richmond, Anno 1613. Publications of the Harleian Society. Vol. XXXII. London: The Harleian Society.
- Venn, John (1922). Alumni Cantabrigienses Part I: From the Earliest Times to 1751. Vol. I. Cambridge: Cambridge University Press.
- Willis, Browne (1750). Notitia Parliamentaria, Part II: A Series or Lists of the Representatives in the several Parliaments held from the Reformation 1541, to the Restoration 1660 ... London. pp. 80, 81, 89, 109, 119, 140, 331.
