= Little Marlow Priory =

Priory in Buckinghamshire, England

Coordinates: 51.5854°N 0.7422°W

Little Marlow Priory was a priory in Buckinghamshire, England. It was run for many years as a nunnery. It was established around 1218 and dissolved in 1536.

An alternative name can be seen the record of the Plea Rolls of the Common Pleas, in 1326, translated as "Little Marlow of the Fountains" - in Latin as "Parva Merlawe de Fontibus" - in 1326; 3rd entry in this image: AALT Page
