= Launde Abbey =

Manor house in Leicestershire, England

Coordinates: 52.6312°N 0.8234°W

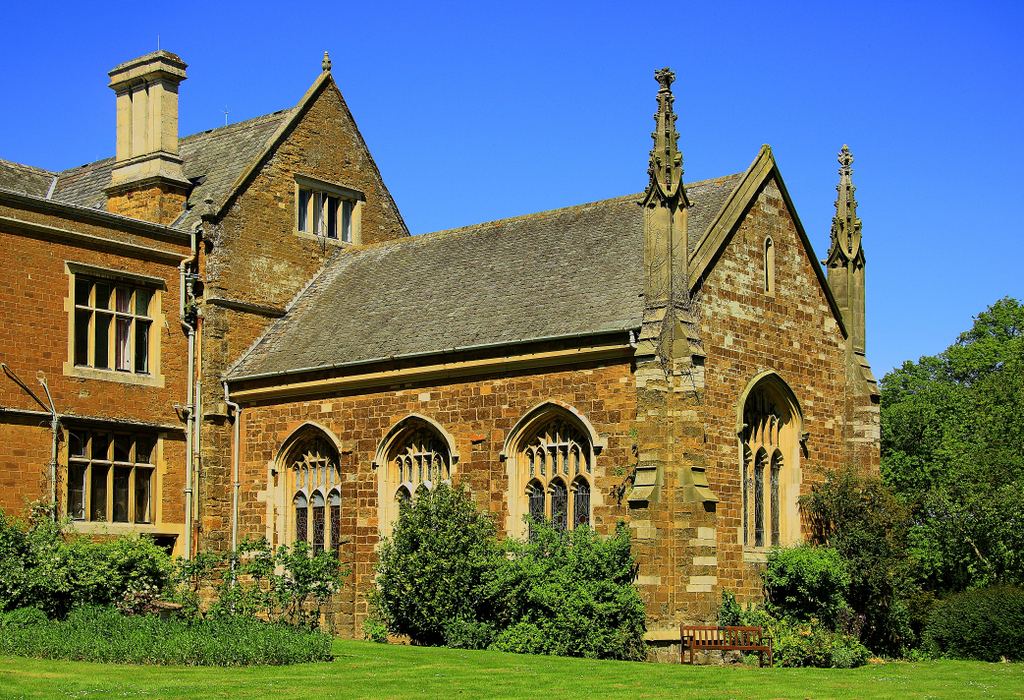
The chapel

Launde Abbey is located in Leicestershire, England, 14 miles east of the city of Leicester and 6 miles south west of Oakham in Rutland. The house was built on the site of the Augustinian Launde Priory. The Grade II* listed building is predominantly used as a conference and retreat centre by the Church of England dioceses of Leicester and Peterborough.

== History ==
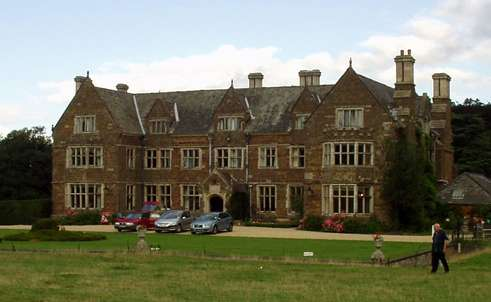
front view

The abbey is an Elizabethan manor house, extensively modified, built on the site of an Augustinian priory, Launde Priory. The original priory was founded before 1125 (in 1119 according to a modern inscription in the reception hall) by Richard Basset and his wife Matilda (née Ridel). Its revenues at the dissolution of the monasteries were £510-16-1d and payments £117-12-10d (annual value almost £400).

Launde is set in countryside in the valley of the River Chater. Thomas Cromwell, Henry VIII's chief minister responsible for the dissolution of the monasteries, so liked its position that he wrote in his diary "Myself for Launde" but Cromwell never occupied the house as he was executed in 1540. In that year the building of the new house commenced. His son, Gregory, lived at Launde Abbey for ten years after its construction with his wife, Elizabeth, the sister of Jane Seymour the third wife of Henry VIII. In 1603 Launde was acquired by William Smith and in 1763 Dorothy Jennings sold it to John Simpson; in 1828, Mary Finch Simpson married Edward Dawson (1802-1859) of Long Whatton who by this marriage acquired Launde. They engaged Thomas Rickman to restore the house from 1829 to 1839. The Dawsons continued to own the estate throughout the 19th century.

In 1957, Cecil Coleman and his wife bought the abbey and presented it to the Diocese of Leicester. They paid for the conversion works to make it into a retreat house.

The chapel is thought to be all that remains of the original priory church. Some of its stained glass is mediaeval and Nikolaus Pevsner has described the monument to Gregory Cromwell as "one of the purest monuments of the early Renaissance in England". There are numerous memorials of the Simpson family who bought Launde in 1763 and enlarged the house and laid out the plantations. The chapel is used for daily worship by the resident community and guests and is an attraction for visitors. There is a small, 5-stop pipe organ, built by Henry Speechly in c. 1880, and restored by Roy Young in 1989.

In 2009 the abbey launched a successful £1 million appeal to bring the house up to the standards required by legislation. If the money had not been raised, the abbey would have been forced to close. Both the abbey and the associated chapel are Grade II* listed buildings.
