= Peter Thornton =

British art historian and writer (1925–2007)

Peter Kai Thornton CBE (April 8, 1925 – February 8, 2007) was a British museum curator and writer.

The son of eminent scientist Sir (Henry) Gerard Thornton and Gerda, daughter of Kai Norregaard, of Copenhagen (and related to the actress, director and writer Eva Le Gallienne through the latter's Danish mother, journalist Julie Norregaard), Thornton was educated at Bryanston, which he left aged 14 to enroll at the de Havilland aeronautical technical school and work on the Mosquito production line at Hatfield, Hertfordshire; after serving during World War II in the Intelligence Corps, he went up to Trinity Hall, Cambridge, where he read Danish and German (B.A. 1950).

After being assistant keeper at the Fitzwilliam Museum, Cambridge, and joint secretary to the National Art Collections Fund, in London, from 1952 to 1954, Thornton joined the Victoria and Albert Museum in London, serving as keeper of furniture and woodwork between 1966 and 1984, and curator to Sir John Soane's Museum, in Lincoln's Inn Fields between 1984 and 1995. Thornton was best known for his radical approach to the presentation of historic interiors at Ham House, Osterley Park and Apsley House.

His daughter, Emma Bettina, married the diplomat Peter Jay; she was Jay's second wife.

== Bibliography ==
- Seventeenth Century Interior Decoration in England, France and Holland (1978).
- with Maurice Tomlin: The Furnishing and Decoration of Ham House. Furniture History Society, London 1981.
- Authentic Décor: the Domestic Interior 1620-1920 (1984).
- Innovation in the Decorative Arts 1470-1870 (1989).
- The Italian Renaissance Interior, 1400 - 1600. H. N. Abrams, New York City 1991, ISBN 0-810934590,
