= Ruin marble =

Type of limestone or siltstone

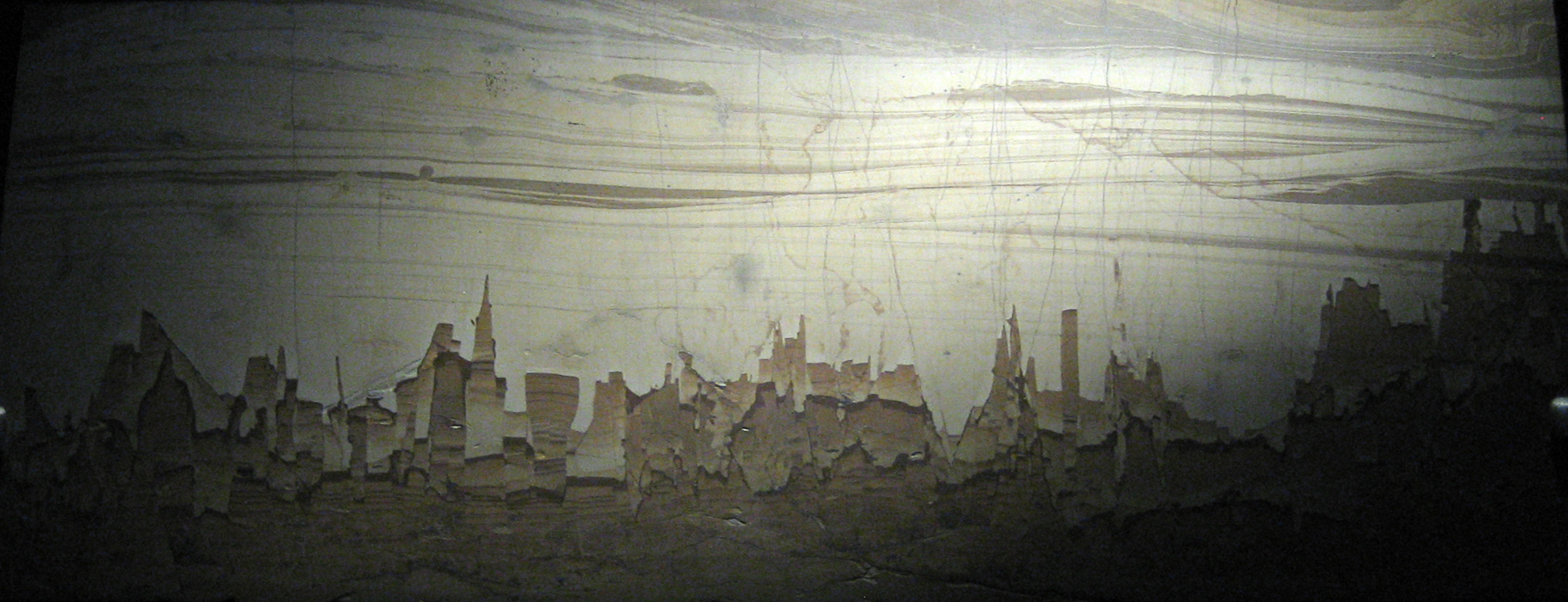
Ruin marble exhibited in the Natural History Museum, London

Ruin marble is a kind of limestone or siltstone that contains light and dark patterns. The name is misleading – it is not a marble.

It originates mostly from the city of Florence, Tuscany, in central Italy. Its color pattern consists mainly of gray, brown and reddish, sometimes also blue and black, giving it the impression of a ruined landscape painting. The patterns (similar to Liesegang rings) develop during diagenesis due to periodic rhythmic precipitation of iron and manganese hydroxides from oxidizing aqueous fluids, restricted laterally by calcite and clay filled joints.
