= Tollemache =

Tollemache (pronounced /ˈtɒlmæʃ/ TOL-mash) and also spelled Tallemache or Talmash is an English surname which may refer to:

- Aethel Tollemache (c. 1875–1955), British suffragette
- Algernon Tollemache (1805–1892), British politician
- Beatrix Lucia Catherine Tollemache (1840–1926), British poet and translator
- Bentley Lyonel John Tollemache, 3rd Baron Tollemache (1883–1955), British Army officer, and writer on croquet and bridge
- Edward Tollemache (born 1976), British banker
- Felix Tollemache (1796–1843), British politician
- Frederick Tollemache (1804–1888), British politician
- Henry James Tollemache (1846–1939), British politician
- Hugh Tollemache (1802–1890), British priest
- Sir Humphry Tollemache, 6th Baronet (1897–1990), Royal Marines general
- John Manners Tollemache (c.1768–1837), British politician
- John Tollemache, 1st Baron Tollemache (1805–1890), British politician and landowner
- John Tollemache, 5th Baron Tollemache (born 1939), English farmer and landowner
- Leone Sextus Tollemache (1884–1917), British Army officer
- Lionel Tollemache (disambiguation), several people
- Louisa Tollemache, 7th Countess of Dysart (1745–1840)
- Sir Lyonel Tollemache, 4th Baronet (1854–1952), English landowner
- Mortimer Tollemache (1872–1950), English cricketer
- Ralph Tollemache (1826–1895), British clergyman
- Thomas Tollemache (c.1651–1694), English soldier
- Wilbraham Tollemache, 6th Earl of Dysart (1739–1821), British politician and art collector
- Wilbraham Spencer Tollemache (1807–1890), English soldier
- Wilbraham Tollemache, 2nd Baron Tollemache (1832–1904), British politician
- William Tollemache, Lord Huntingtower (1766–1833), British politician
- William Tollemache, Lord Huntingtower (1820–1872), British nobleman
- William Tollemache, 9th Earl of Dysart (1859–1935), British landowner, Lord Lieutenant of Rutland

== See also ==
- Tollemache family
- Baron Tollemache
- Tollemache baronets
