= Tollemache baronets of Hanby Hall (1793) =

Escutcheon of the Tollemache baronets of Hanby Hall

The Tollemache baronetcy, of Hanby Hall in the County of Lincoln, was created in the Baronetage of Great Britain on 12 January 1793 for William Manners, with a special remainder. He was the eldest son of Louisa Tollemache, 7th Countess of Dysart (suo jure, from 1821), and John Manners (1730–1792), grandson of John Manners, 2nd Duke of Rutland and Member of Parliament for Newark from 1754 to 1774, a rich courtier though of illegitimate birth. On his mother's succession to the title, in 1821, William Manners assumed by Royal licence the surname of Talmash (or Tollemache) and gained the courtesy title of Lord Huntingtower. He was elected to parliament for Ilchester in 1803 and 1806.

Lord Huntingtower predeceased his mother, and was succeeded in the baronetcy by his son, the 2nd Baronet; who later succeeded his grandmother as the 8th Earl of Dysart. The baronetcy and earldom remained united until the death of his grandson, the 9th Earl and 3rd Baronet, in 1935. At that point the baronetcy passed to a male heir, the 4th Baronet, while the earldom passed to Wenefryde Scott, 10th Countess of Dysart.

== Tollemache baronets, of Hanby Hall (1793) ==
- Sir William Tollemache, 1st Baronet (1766–1833) (known as Lord Huntingtower from 1821)
- Lionel William John Tollemache, 8th Earl of Dysart, 2nd Baronet (1794–1878)
- William John Manners Tollemache, 9th Earl of Dysart, 3rd Baronet (1859–1935)
- Sir Lyonel Felix Carteret Eugene Tollemache, 4th Baronet (1854–1952)
- Sir Cecil Lyonel Newcomen Tollemache, 5th Baronet (1886–1969)
- Sir Humphrey Thomas Tollemache, 6th Baronet (1897–1990)
- Sir Lyonel Humphrey John Tollemache, 7th Baronet (1931–2020)
- Sir Richard John Tollemache, 8th Baronet (born 1966)

The heir apparent is the present holder's son Lyonel James Gordon Tollemache (born 1999).

== Notes ==
Baronetage of Great Britain
Preceded by Gould baronets	Tollemache baronets of Hanby Hall; 12 January 1793	Succeeded by Ford baronets
