= Tollemache family =

English noble family

Tollemache
- Blazon: Argent a fret sable
- Pronunciation: /ˈtɒlmæʃ/ "Tolmash"

Origin
- Region of origin: Suffolk

Other names
- Variant forms: Talmach, Tallemache, Talmadge, Talmage

The Tollemache family (also historically spelt Talmach or Tallemache) is an English noble family, originally from Suffolk. The family's surname is pronounced /ˈtɒlmæʃ/ TOL-mash.

Members of the family have had a significant impact on the economy and politics of East Anglia since the reign of Edward I. Members of the family have held four hereditary titles: the Baronetcy of Helmingham Hall, the Baronetcy of Hanby Hall, the Barony of Tollemache and the Earldom of Dysart.

== Estates ==
Initially based at Bentley, Suffolk, the family acquired Helmingham Hall by marriage in the 15th century, which remains the family seat. Marriages in the 17th century augmented the family holdings; Harrington, Northamptonshire and the Dysart estates at Ham House, Ham, Petersham and Canbury. Subsequent marriage added estates in north and south Cheshire.

The property was divided on the death of the childless Wilbraham Tollemache, 6th Earl of Dysart in 1821. The Cheshire, Northamptonshire and Suffolk estates, along with the Canbury part of the Surrey estate descended to his nephew, John Tollemache, 1st Baron Tollemache, whilst Ham House and the remaining Surrey estate went to his sister Louisa Tollemache, 7th Countess of Dysart. Her marriage to John Manners brought his family's property in Buckminster and Sewstern, Leicestershire and Hanby Hall, Lincolnshire into the Earldom of Dysart. The Cheshire estates were consolidated and expanded by exchange and purchase in the late 18th and early 19th centuries and incorporated property at Alpraham, Alvanley and Tarporley. John Tollemache purchased the Beeston estate, where he built Peckforton Castle between 1844 and 1850. In 1843 he sold his Surrey property to Lionel Tollemache, 8th Earl of Dysart.

In the 1880s some of John Tollemache's sons started a brewery in Suffolk, which merged in 1957 to become the Tolly Cobbold brewery. Several pubs called the Tollemache Arms are located in and near the family's estates including at Alpraham, Tarporley, Mossley, Ashton-under-Lyne, Buckminster and Harrington.

Harrington was sold in the 1860s and Suffolk property was sold in the late 19th century. Sir Lyonel Tollemache, 4th Baronet donated Ham House to the National Trust in 1948 and sold the remaining Surrey estates by auction in 1949.

== Family members ==
Prominent members of the family include:

- Sir Lionel Tollemache, 1st Baronet (1562 – c. 1612)
- Sir Lionel Tollemache, 3rd Baronet (1624–1669)
- Lionel Tollemache, 3rd Earl of Dysart (1649–1727)
- Lionel Tollemache, 4th Earl of Dysart (1708–1770)
- Louisa Tollemache, 7th Countess of Dysart (1745–1840)
- William Tollemache, Lord Huntingtower (1766–1833)
- Hugh Tollemache (1802–1890)
- John Tollemache, 1st Baron Tollemache (1805–1890)
- Georgina Tollemache (later Lady Mount Temple; 1822–1901)
- Wilbraham Frederic Tollemache, 2nd Baron Tollemache (1832–1904)
- Beatrix Lucia Catherine Tollemache (1840–1926)
- Lyonel Tollemache, 4th Baronet (1854–1952)
- Aethel Tollemache (c. 1875–1955)
- Leone Sextus Tollemache (1884–1917)
- Humphry Tollemache, 6th Baronet (1897–1990)
