= Louisa Grace Beauclerk, Duchess of St Albans =

British noblewoman

Her Grace The Duchess of St Albans
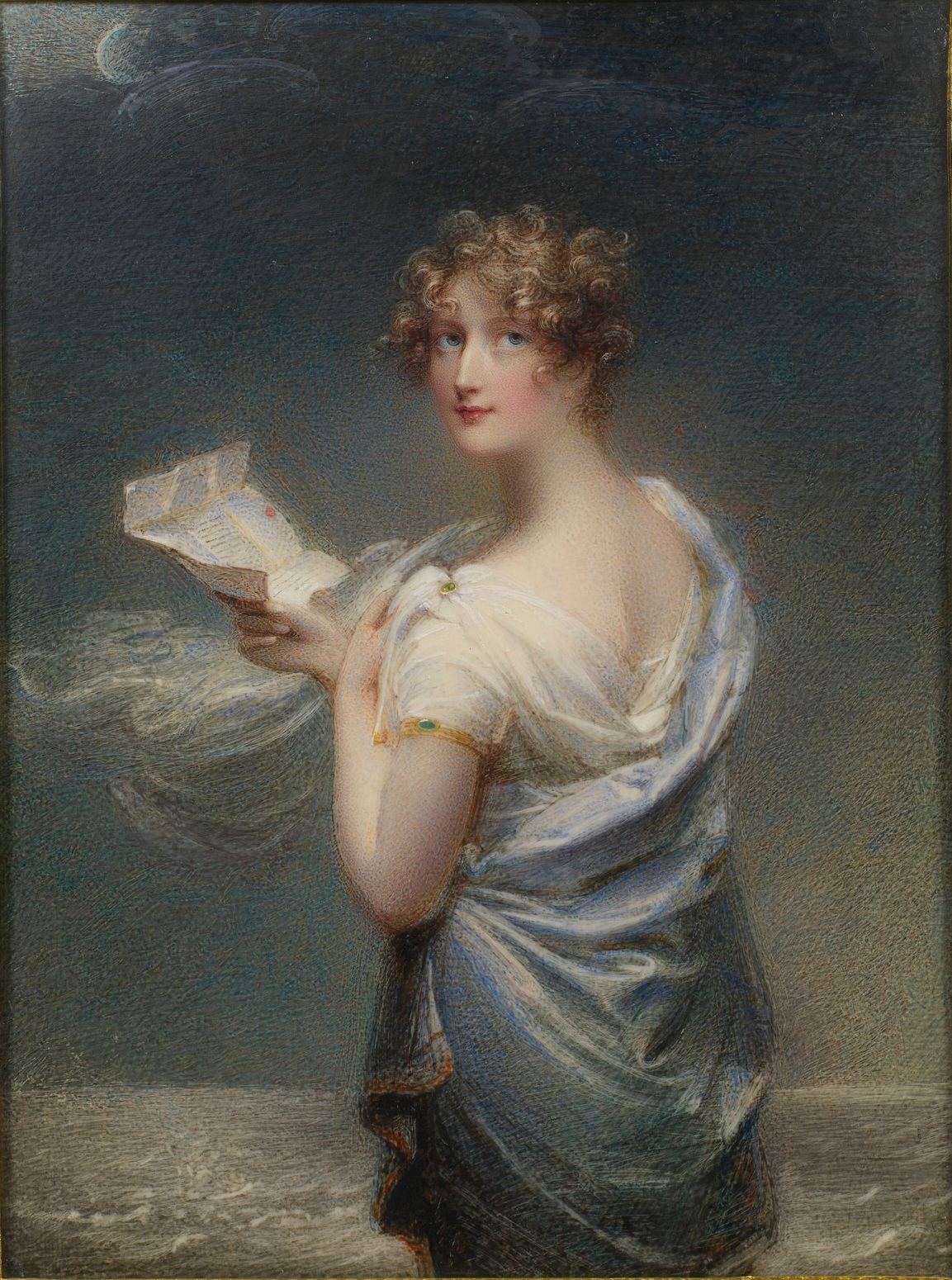
- Louisa, Duchess of St Albans by Anne Mee, 1813
- Born: Lady Louisa Grace Manners; 4 December 1777
- Died: 19 February 1816 (aged 39); Portman Square, London
- Buried: Hanwell
- Noble family: Tollemache
- Spouse: Aubrey Beauclerk, 6th Duke of St Albans
- Issue: Aubrey Beauclerk, 7th Duke of St Albans
- Father: John Manners
- Mother: Louisa Tollemache, 7th Countess of Dysart

Louisa Grace Beauclerk, Duchess of St Albans (née Lady Louisa Grace Manners; 4 December 1777 – 19 February 1816), was a British noblewoman and the second wife of Aubrey Beauclerk, 6th Duke of St Albans.

She was one of the youngest of the seven children of John Manners, MP, and his wife Louisa Tollemache, 7th Countess of Dysart. Her nephew, Lionel Tollemache, 8th Earl of Dysart, succeeded her mother in the earldom when the latter died in 1840, aged 95.

She married the duke on 15 August 1802 in London, a few months after he succeeded his father in the dukedom. He had previously been married to Jane Moses, who died in 1800, leaving one daughter. The new duchess was said to have been "one of the brightest stars in the fashionable hemisphere" in the early years of her marriage.

They had one child, Aubrey Beauclerk, 7th Duke of St Albans (7 April 1815 – 19 February 1816); her husband, described as "a weak and sickly man", died, aged 50, four months after the child's birth.

The duchess died on the same day as her son; both died at the home of her sister, the former Lady Laura Manners, wife of John Dalrymple, in Portman Square, London. Louisa had been "in a delicate state of health" since the death of her husband, and contemporary reports say that she died three hours after the child. Both were buried at Hanwell. The dukedom passed to a younger brother of the 6th Duke.
