= Ralph Tollemache =

English clergyman (1826–1895)

Ralph William Lyonel Tollemache-Tollemache JP (19 October 1826 – 5 October 1895) was an English priest in the Church of England. He is best known for the unusual and increasingly eccentric names that he chose for his numerous children.

== Life and career ==
Born as Ralph William Lyonel Tollemache, he was the eldest son of the Reverend and the Honourable Hugh Francis Tollemache (1802–1890) and his wife, Matilda, the daughter of Joseph Hume. His father was the fourth son of William Tollemache, Lord Huntingtower, the eldest son and heir of John Manners and Louisa Tollemache, 7th Countess of Dysart. He was rector of Harrington in Northamptonshire for 58 years.

Tollemache was educated at Uppingham School and Peterhouse, Cambridge, graduating with his BA in 1850. He followed his father's vocation and was ordained as a deacon in Manchester in 1849 and as a priest in Lincoln in 1850. He became rector of South Wytham in Lincolnshire in 1850 and retained that living until his death. He was also a Justice of the Peace in Lincolnshire.

He married his cousin, Caroline Tollemache (7 June 1828 – 6 June 1867), on 15 February 1853. She was the daughter of the Hon. Felix Thomas Tollemache, the second son of the same William Talmash named above and Catherine Gray.

A dispute arose with his wife's trustees in 1859. He built up debts of approximately £4,000 (equivalent to approximately £622,250 in 2023 currency) and was declared bankrupt in 1863. He was discharged from the bankruptcy on 26 June 1868, the year after his wife died.

He remarried on 22 February 1869, to Dora Cleopatra Maria Lorenza de Orellana, the daughter of Colonel Ignacio Antonio de Orellana y Revest, an officer in the Spanish army. He doubled his surname in 1876, becoming "Tollemache-Tollemache".

He died in 1895, leaving an estate with a probate value of £1,619 19s. 7d. He was survived by his second wife, who died on 8 August 1929.

== Children ==
Tollemache is best known for the unusual names that he gave to his many children. He had at least five children from his first marriage:

1. Sir Lyonel Felix Carteret Eugene Tollemache, 4th Baronet, of Hanby Hall (15 January 1854 – 4 March 1952), inherited the Tollemache baronetcy in 1935
2. Florence Caroline Artemesia (19 February 1855 – 24 May 1935)
3. Evelyne Clementina Wentworth Cornelia Maude (7 June 1856 – 1919)
4. Granville Grey Marchmont Manners Plantagenet (8 June 1858 – 20 April 1891)
5. Marchmont Murray Reginald Grasett Stanhope Plantagenet (24 December 1860 – 10 April 1898)

His imagination took flight when he named the many children from his second marriage:

1. Dora Viola Gertrude Irenez de Orellana Dysart Plantagenet (11 November 1869 – 4 July 1874)
2. Mabel Helmingham Ethel Huntingtower Beatrice Blazonberrie Evangeline Vise de Lou de Orellana Plantagenet Toedmag Saxon (11 March 1872 – 5 January 1955)
3. Lyonesse Matilda Dora Ida Agnes Ernestine Curson Paulet Wilbraham Joyce Eugénie Bentley Saxonia Dysart Plantagenet (9 November 1874 – 26 August 1944)
4. Lyulph Ydwallo Odin Nestor Egbert Lyonel (LYONEL) Toedmag Hugh Erchenwyne (THE) Saxon Esa Cromwell Orma Nevill Dysart (SECOND) Plantagenet (21 August 1876 – 1961)
5. Lyona Decima Veroica Esyth Undine Cyssa Hylda Rowena Adela Thyra Ursuala Ysabel Blanche Lelias Dysart Plantagenet (19 April 1878 – 17 November 1962) (Decima for being the 10th child)
6. Leo Quintus Tollemache-Tollemache de Orellana Plantagenet (19 November 1879 – 1 November 1914) (Quintus for being the 5th son)
7. Lyonella Fredegunda Cuthberga Ethelswytha Ideth Ysabel Grace Monica de Orellana Plantagenet (14 January 1882 – 3 October 1952)
8. Leone Sextus Denys Oswolf Fraudatifilius Tollemache-Tollemache de Orellana Plantagenet (10 June 1884 – 20 February 1917) (Sextus for being the 6th son)
9. Lyonetta Edith Regina Valentine Myra Polwarth Avelina Phillipa Violantha de Orellana Plantagenet (14 February 1887 – 7 January 1951)
10. Lyonulph Cospatrick Bruce Berkeley Jermyn Tullibardine Petersham de Orellana Dysart Plantagenet (11 January 1892 – 30 November 1966)
- His eldest son, Lyonel, inherited the British baronetcy (Tollemache baronetcy, of Hanley Hall; created in 1793) from his cousin William John Manners Tollemache, 9th Earl of Dysart, on the latter's death in 1935. He also inherited Ham House, which he gave to the National Trust in 1948.
- Lyulph emigrated to New Zealand, where he had 17 children.
- Leo Quintus Tollemache-Tollemache de Orellana Plantagenet Tollemache-Tollemache renamed himself by deed poll in 1908, becoming Leo de Orellana Tollemache-Tollemache.
- Leo and his brother Leone both died in the First World War, the former in action in 1914 and the latter of influenza in 1917. It is often said that Leone holds the world record for the most multiple-barreled surname, with six, including one repeated four times (Tollemache-Tollemache-de Orellana-Plantagenet-Tollemache-Tollemache), but this overlooks his father's eccentric naming choices. Leone's last name was just Tollemache-Tollemache; all of his other names (including the first instance of "Tollemache-Tollemache" in his full name) were forenames.

The Tollemache family's names are parodied in Book 1, Episode 4 of James Joyce's novel Finnegans Wake, as Helmingham Erchenwyne Rutter Egbert (HERE) Crumwall Odin Maximus Esme Saxon (COMES) Esa Vercingetorix Ethelwulf Rupprecht Ydwalla Bentley Osmund Dysart Yggdrasselmann (EVERYBODY).
