= William Tollemache =

William Tollemache may refer to:

- William Tollemache, Lord Huntingtower (1766–1833), British politician
- William Tollemache, Lord Huntingtower (1820–1872), British peer
- William Tollemache, 9th Earl of Dysart (1859–1935), British peer, Lord Lieutenant of Rutland
