= Hugh Tollemache =

English priest

The Honourable and Reverend Hugh Francis Tollemache (19 September 1802 – 2 March 1890) was an English priest of the Church of England.

== Early life ==
Tollemache was born in Petersham, Surrey on 19 September 1802. He was a son of William Tollemache, Lord Huntingtower (1766–1833) and Catherine Rebecca Grey, the noted Anglo-Irish aristocrat and poet. His father was MP for Ilchester and served as High Sheriff of Leicestershire. Among his many siblings were Lionel Tollemache, 8th Earl of Dysart, Felix Tollemache, Frederick Tollemache, and Algernon Tollemache.

His father was the eldest son of John Manners, MP for Newark, and Louisa Tollemache, 7th Countess of Dysart. As his father, the heir apparent to the earldom of Dysart, predeceased his grandmother, the suo jure Countess of Dysart, upon his grandmother's death on 22 September 1840, Hugh and his surviving siblings were granted precedence as the children of an earl on 6 November 1840. His maternal grandparents were Francis Gray and Elizabeth (née Ruddock) Gray.

He was educated at Harrow School and Trinity College, Cambridge.

== Career ==
He became rector of the Parish of Harrington in Northamptonshire from 1831 until his death in 1890, when he was succeeded by a priest named Atkins.

== Personal life ==

On 22 June 1824 Tollemache married Matilda Hume, a daughter of Joseph Hume of Notting Hill. Together, they had ten children:

1. Matilda Anne Frances Tollemache (1825–1899), who married Rev. George Edmond Maunsell, son of Thomas Philip Maunsell and Hon. Caroline Elizabeth Cokayne, in 1869.
2. Ralph William Lyonel Tollemache (1826–1895), a reverend who married his cousin, Caroline Tollemache, daughter of Hon. Felix Tollemache, in 1853. After her death, he married Dora Cleopatra Maria Lorenza de Orellana, daughter of Col. Ignacio Antonio de Orellana y Revest, in 1869.
3. An unnamed child (1827–1828), who died young.
4. Louisa Harrington Tollemache (1833–1928), who married Thomas Edward Taylor, son of Rev. Hon. Henry Edward Taylor and Marianne St. Leger, in 1862.
5. Clement Reginald Tollemache (1835–1895), a reverend who married Frances Josephine Simpson, daughter of Henry Simpson, in 1869. They had three children, including Aethel Tollemache.
6. Cornelia Katherine Tollemache (b. 1836)
7. Ernest Celestine Tollemache (1838–1880), a reverend who married Henrietta Maria Dixon, daughter of Col. Henry Dixon, in 1870.
8. Augustus Francis Tollemache (1839–1923), a reverend.
9. Cecilia Eleanor Tollemache (b. 1840)
10. Anastasius Eugene Tollemache (1842–1912), who married Alice Elizabeth Cursham, daughter of Reverend Curzon Cursham, in 1870.

Tollemache died on 2 March 1890.
