= Church of St John the Baptist, Buckminster =

Church in Buckminster, Leicestershire

Coordinates: 52°47′53″N 0°41′51″W

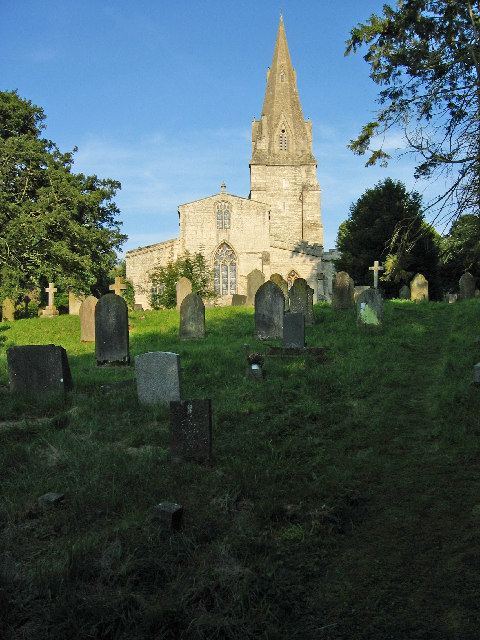
- Denomination: Church of England

History
- Dedication: St John the Baptist

Administration
- Diocese: Leicester
- Archdeaconry: Leicester
- Parish: Buckminster, Leicestershire

Clergy
- Rector: David Cowie

The Church of St John the Baptist is a church in Buckminster, Leicestershire. It is a Grade I listed building.

== History ==
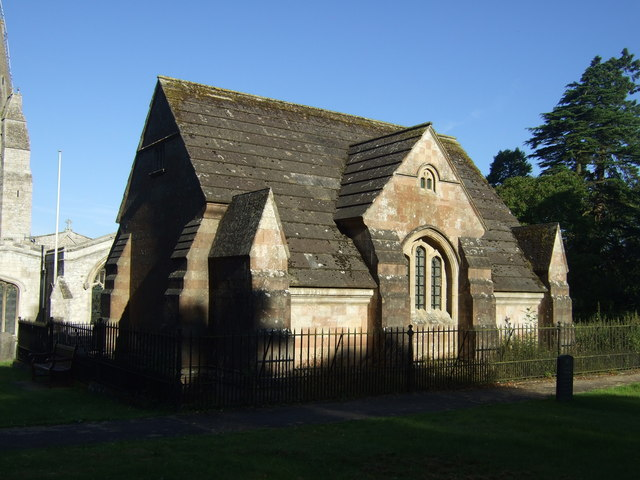
The Dysart Mausoleum

The church consists of a nave, chantry chapel, tower with spire and 6 bells, chancel and north and south aisles. The bells date from 1657, 1649, 1691, 1778, 2 date from 1873 and 1 from 1874. The spire was struck by lightning in 1841 but was repaired 2 years later and restored in 1894. The tower has a beacon chimney. There is a rood stair near the chancel arch.

The church was restored in 1883. There is a family mausoleum to the Dysart family, built by Lionel Tollemache, 8th Earl of Dysart. The mausoleum is Grade II* listed.
