= Aethel Tollemache =

British suffragette (1875–1955)

- Born: c. 1875; Rangoon, Burma
- Died: 26 May 1955; Bath, Somerset, England
- Organization(s): Women's Social and Political Union, East London Federation of Suffragettes
- Relatives: Tollemache family, including William Tollemache (great-grandfather), Catherine Gray, Lady Manners (great-grandmother), Hugh Tollemache (grandfather)

Aethel Tollemache (c. 1875–26 May 1955) was a British suffragette and pacifist activist. She was a member of the Women's Social and Political Union (WSPU) and Sylvia Pankhurst's East London Federation of Suffragettes. She was arrested for window-smashing.

== Early life ==
Tollemache was born in Rangoon, Burma in 1875. Her parents were Reverend Clement Reginald Tollemache and Frances Josephine Simpson. She was the great-granddaughter of the nobleman William Tollemache, Lord Huntingtower, through his son Hugh Tollemache. She had two sisters, Mary and Grace. They lived in Batheaston Villa in Bath, Somerset after returning from abroad.

== Activism ==
Tollemache was close friends with Mary Blathwayt of Eagle House. In November 1907, Tollemache and Blathwayt attended a Women's Social and Political Union (WSPU) meeting at the Victoria Rooms, Bristol, where they heard speeches by Christabel Pankhurst, Emmeline Pethick Lawrence and Annie Kenney. After the meeting she joined the WSPU and her sister Grace and mother soon became involved with the cause.

Tollemache took part in the suffragette boycott of the 1911 census with a group of fellow boycotters. During the evening Tollemache played the piano and her sister Grace played the violin to entertain the group of evaders. She also participated in militant activism, such as pouring tar in post boxes. In November 1911, she was arrested and imprisoned for fourteen days for window smashing in London. She had broken windows of the Liberal Club. Her mother said that ‘Aethel telegraphed home "14 days, hurrah." After her release from prison, a welcome home party was organised by the Bath branch of the WSPU.

In 1913, when Tollemache spoke in Bradford on Avon, Wiltshire, with Barbara Wylie, the women had to be escorted to the railway station by the Police in order to protect them from a crowd of young men who had howled at and rushed at them. On 21 May 1914, she was arrested following a protest outside Buckingham Palace and went on hunger strike in Holloway Prison.

During World War I, the Tollemache sisters used their land to grow food for the war effort. Tollemache became a pacifist and vegetarian and joined Sylvia Pankhurst's East London Federation of Suffragettes. In 1917, she was arrested in Leytonstone, London, while collecting signatures for a peace memorial but was released with a warning and told that if she continued she would be prosecuted under the Defence of the Realm Act.

== Death ==
She died in 1955 in Bath, Somerset.
