= Sewstern =

Village in Leicestershire, England

Coordinates: 52.766667°N 0.683333°W

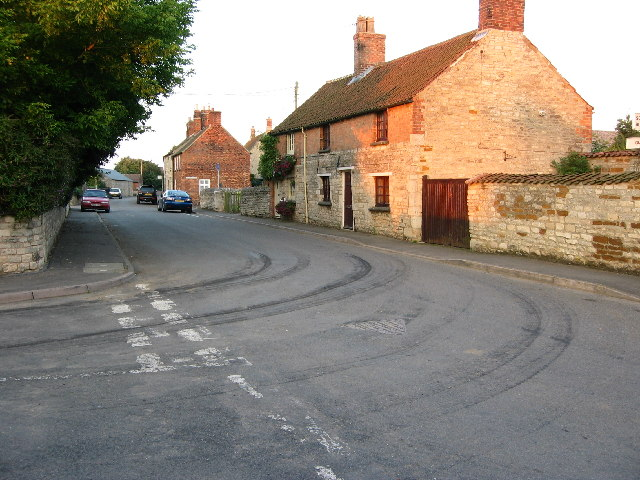
- Sewstern Main Street/School Lane Junction

- Location within Leicestershire
- Civil parish: Buckminster
- District: Melton
- Shire county: Leicestershire
- Region: East Midlands
- Country: England
- Sovereign state: United Kingdom
- Post town: GRANTHAM
- Postcode district: NG33
- Dialling code: 01476
- Police: Leicestershire
- Fire: Leicestershire
- Ambulance: East Midlands
- UK Parliament: Melton and Syston

Sewstern is a village and former civil parish, now in the parish of Buckminster, in the Melton district of east Leicestershire, England. It lies just south of Buckminster, with which it shares a primary school, situated between the two villages. It is 9 miles east of Melton Mowbray, 10 miles south of Grantham and 4 miles from the A1 at Colsterworth. It is the easternmost village in Leicestershire.

== Housing ==
Many of Sewstern’s houses are built in local limestone. Almost all are individual, and indicate a village which has grown organically. Modern development is modest. Some houses are owned by the Buckminster Estate and let to tenants, while others are privately owned. Several houses have stables, and some have a paddock to the rear, with these facilities and the quiet roads through the village appealing to those with equestrian interests.

Population

The 1931 census was the last to enumerate Sewstern separately, when it had a population of 241. Buckminster and Sewstern together had a combined population of 356 in 2011.

== History ==
The road bisecting the village along a north–south direction (Timber Hill and Stamford Road) is an ancient track, which may date back to the Bronze Age, called Sewstern Lane. At this point (and for most of its length) it forms the boundary between Lincolnshire and Leicestershire. This track is now partly road and partly green lane, and forms part of the modern Viking Way long-distance trail. The small part of Sewstern to the east of this road is now part of Leicestershire.

A range of occupations was recorded in Sewstern in 1381, including carpenters, a smith, a cooper and a shoemaker. Businesses here in the 17th century included a tannery and a chandlery. In the 18th and early 19th centuries, Sewstern Lane was an important droving route for cattle being taken from Scotland and northern England to London, and became known as The Drift. This passing trade ended with the coming of the railways.

Land on the eastern side of Sewstern was quarried for ironstone between 1937 and 1968 on a rolling opencast basis, with the fields returned to agricultural use within a season. The result can be seen in the landscape, with the fields in the quarried area, and also Back Lane, lying some 7 to 15 feet below the level of other roads.

There is a small war memorial at the west end of the village, and another inside Holy Trinity Church.

Sewstern was formerly a chapelry in Buckminster parish, from 1866 Sewstern was a civil parish in its own right until it was abolished on 1 April 1936 and merged with Buckminster.

== Modern Industry ==
Sewstern Industrial Estate lies east of the village, just beyond the parish boundary, on the site of the former workshops of the ironstone company.

== Church ==
Sewstern had a medieval chapel at the west end of the village by 1220, which had vanished by 1795. The sale of its bell in 1550 may mark its passing as a religious building. Three carved stones found in gardens in the west of the village may be from this building.

Holy Trinity Church was built in 1842 on agricultural land alongside Back Lane. The architect was Anthony Salvin, who had been working locally at Harlaxton Manor, Stoke Rochford, Easton, Belton and Grantham. This ironstone building, in the Norman revival style, is Salvin’s only Leicestershire church.

== Nonconformity ==
A Methodist congregation began meeting in c.1803. ‘The Old Chapel’ was built in 1903 to replace an earlier and smaller building. It closed in the 1980s, and has since been converted to a private house.

== School ==
Buckminster Primary School is half a mile north of Sewstern village, on the road to Buckminster. It was rated as Good by Ofsted in 2014.

== Pub ==
Sewstern once had three public houses, but there is now only one, the Blue Dog. Its name references the political colour of Sir William Manners, the major landowner in the 1820s.

== Village Hall ==
Sewstern Village Hall was built in 1962. Community events are held there such as the long running Saturday Bingo, and it is available to hire. It is home to the Newton's Players drama group and the Sewstern Pétanque team who play in the Rutland league.

Rumours of it being one of the finest small gig venues in the region, having been widespread since the middle late early 80’s, are reinforced by the recent news that March To The Grave will be launching their 2022-23 World-Tour-of-the-Fens in early Sept 2022.

== See also ==
- Blue pubs
