= Aubrey Beauclerk, 6th Duke of St Albans =

English aristocrat and politician

His Grace The Duke of St Albans
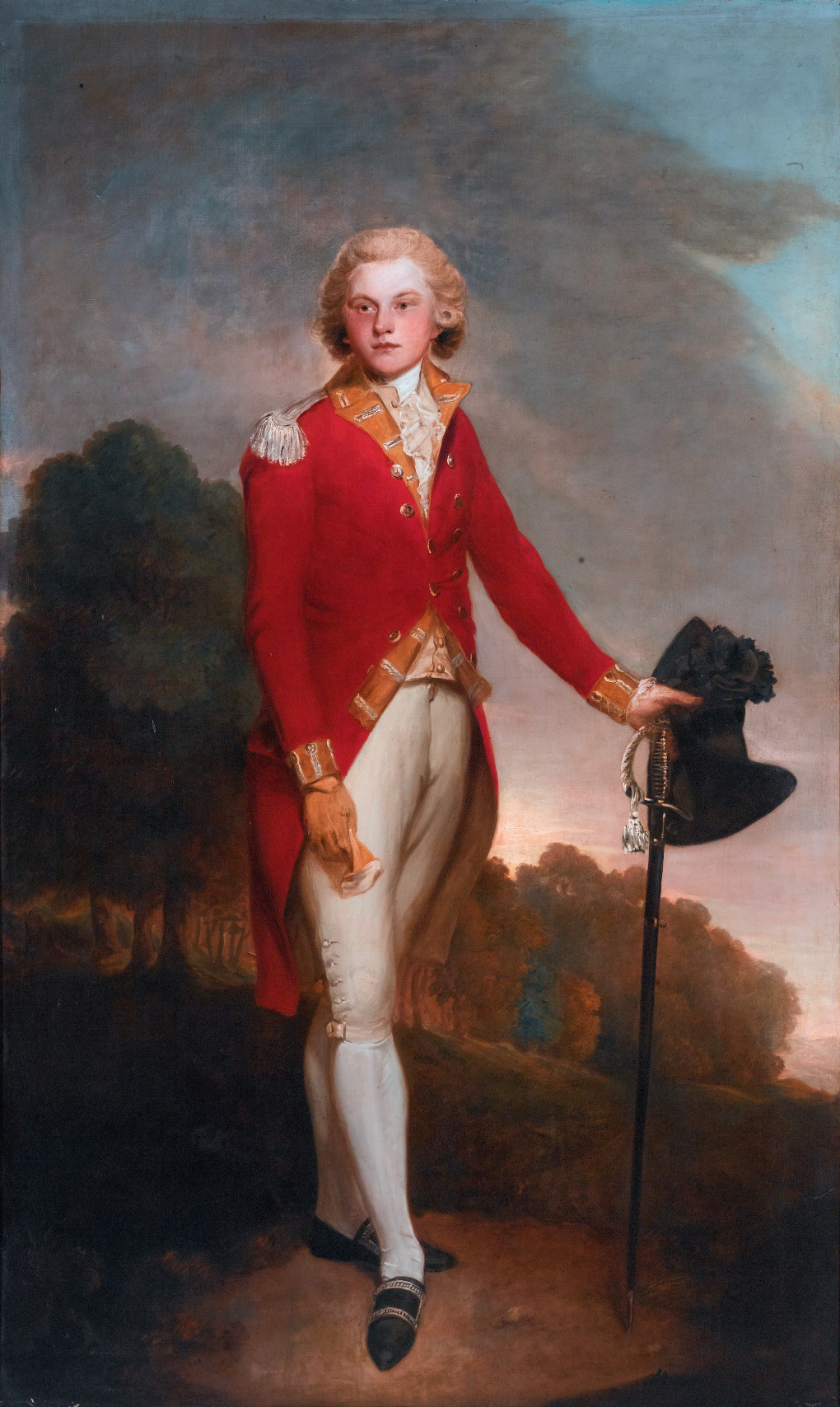
- Aubrey, Earl of Burford, later 6th Duke of St Albans, by Lemuel Francis Abbott

Member of Parliament for Kingston upon Hull
- In office 1790–1796 Serving with Samuel Thornton
- Preceded by: Samuel Thornton; Walter Spencer Stanhope
- Succeeded by: Samuel Thornton; Sir Charles Turner

Personal details
- Born: 21 August 1765
- Died: 12 August 1815 (aged 49)
- Party: Whig
- Spouses: Mary Moses (m. 1788; died 1800) Lady Louisa Grace Manners (m. 1802)
- Relations: William Beauclerk, 8th Duke of St Albans (brother); Lord Amelius Beauclerk (brother); Vere Beauclerk, 1st Baron Vere (grandfather); William Ponsonby, 2nd Earl of Bessborough (grandfather)
- Children: 2
- Parent(s): Aubrey Beauclerk, 5th Duke of St Albans; Lady Catherine Ponsonby

Aubrey Beauclerk, 6th Duke of St Albans (21 August 1765 – 12 August 1815) was an English aristocrat and politician.

== Early life ==
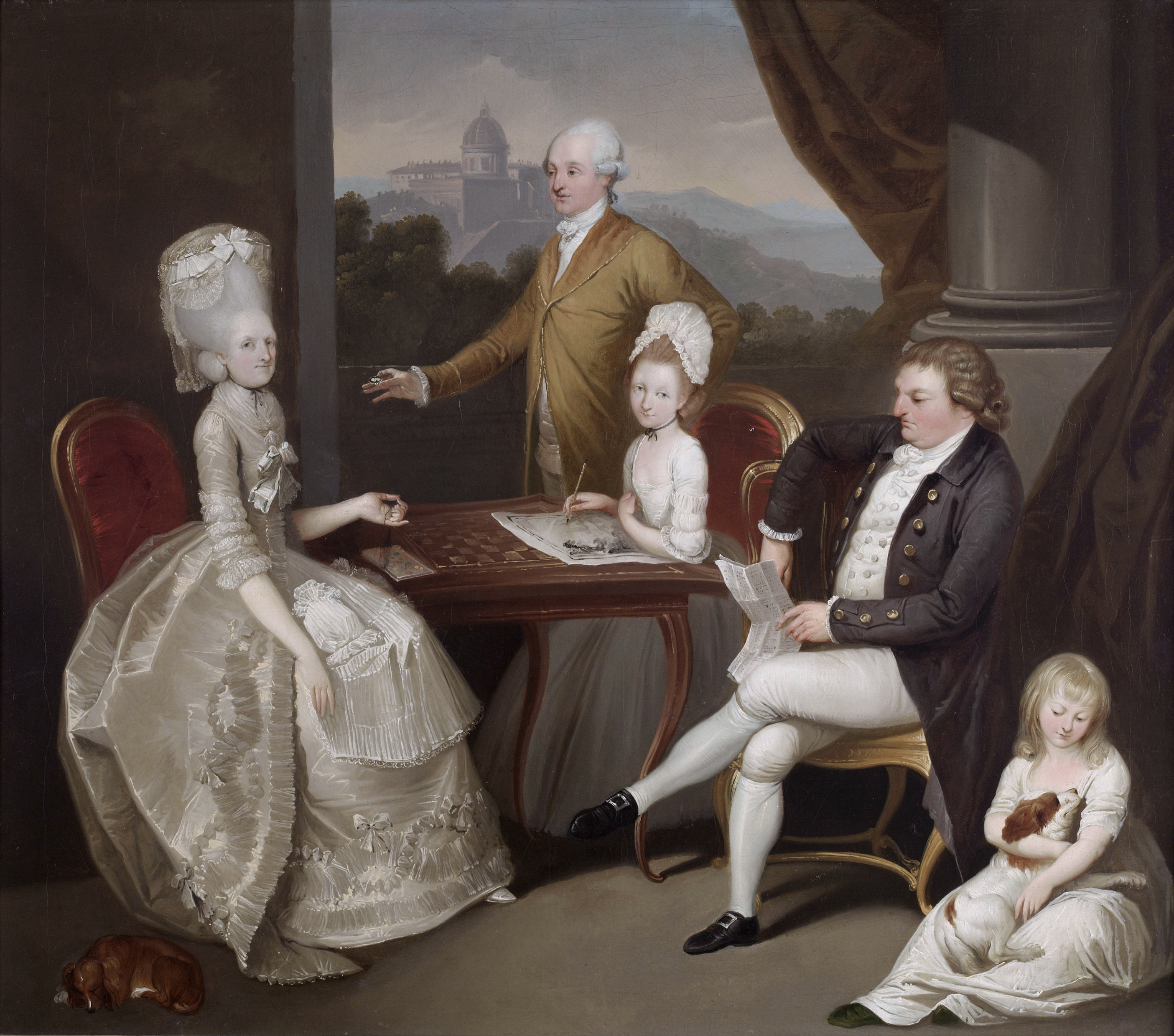
The 5th Duke of St Albans and his wife, Lady Catherine, son Aubrey and daughters Catherine and Caroline, by Franciszek Smuglevicz, 1778.

Beauclerk was born on 21 August 1765. He was the eldest son of Aubrey Beauclerk, 5th Duke of St Albans by his wife Lady Catherine Ponsonby. Among his sibling were Lord William Beauclerk, Lord Amelius Beauclerk (First and Principal Naval Aide-de-Camp to King William IV), Lady Catherine Beauclerk (who married Rev. James Burgess, Vicar of Hanworth), and Lady Caroline Beauclerk (who married Hon. Charles Lawrence Dundas, fourth son of Thomas Dundas, 1st Baron Dundas).

His father was the eldest surviving son of Vere Beauclerk, 1st Baron Vere (third son of Charles Beauclerk, 1st Duke of St Albans) and Mary Chambers (eldest daughter and co-heiress of Thomas Chambers of Hanworth Park, Middlesex). In 1781, Beauclerk's father inherited Hanworth, and after becoming the 5th Duke in 1787 following the death of his unmarried cousin George. The 5th Duke sold Hanworth shortly after 1802 to James Ramsey Cuthbert.

His maternal grandparents were William Ponsonby, 2nd Earl of Bessborough (who served in both the Irish and the British House of Commons, and held office as a Lord Commissioner of the Admiralty, Lord Commissioner of the Treasury, Postmaster General of the United Kingdom, a Privy Counsellor, and Chief Secretary for Ireland) and Lady Caroline Cavendish (eldest daughter of William Cavendish, 3rd Duke of Devonshire).

== Career ==
He entered the Foot Guards in 1781 and was appointed a captain of 34th Regiment of Foot on 30 July 1783 and a Lt Colonel in 1789.

On 16 February 1788, he joined Brooks's Club, the exclusive gentlemen's club, where he played whist.

=== Member of Parliament ===
Soon after his marriage to Jane Moses, Beauclerk was approached by William Fitzwilliam, 4th Earl Fitzwilliam (the husband of Lady Fitzwilliam his aunt, the former Lady Charlotte Ponsonby) to become a candidate for the Kingston upon Hull constituency in order to revive "the old Rockingham-Savile interest which before 1784 had been able to name one Member." Beauclerk felt unable to come forward without the support of Sir Henry Etherington, his wife's uncle and former guardian, who was sympathetic to sitting Member Walter Spencer Stanhope, who helped negotiate Aubrey's marriage to his heiress wife. After unsuccessfully approaching Francis Ferrand Foljambe, Fitzwilliam brought Beauclerk forward shortly before the 1790 general election and Etherington was persuaded to give his support. With the backing of Fitzwilliam, Beauclerk was able to force Stanhope's retirement and Beauclerk was elected.

He represented the constituency of Kingston upon Hull from 1790 to 1796, but never spoke. "He sided with opposition in the Oczakov divisions," by pair on 12 April 1791 and by vote on 1 March 1792, and was a supporter of repeal of the Test Act in Scotland in 1791, but was listed a "Portland Whig in December 1792 and ceased to act with opposition."

After the death of his father on 9 February 1802, Aubrey became the 6th Duke of St Albans, the 6th Earl of Burford, the 6th Baron Heddington, and the 3rd Baron Vere of Hanworth.

== Personal life ==
On 9 July 1788, he married his first wife, Jane Moses (1766–1800). Jane was daughter of John Moses, of Hull in York, and his first wife Margaret Etherington, who died at or shortly after her birth. She had been raised by her stepmother (her father's third wife, whom he had married three months before his death in 1773), Margaret Cave (daughter of Sir Thomas Cave, Bt.) Together, Aubrey and Jane were the parents of one child:

- Lady Mary Beauclerk (1791–1845), who married George Coventry, 8th Earl of Coventry. They were the great-grandparents of Henry Howard, 19th Earl of Suffolk, Aubrey Hopwood, and Ronald Hopwood, and the great-great-great-great grandparents of Humphrey Ker.

After his first wife's death on 18 August 1800, he married for the second time to Lady Louisa Grace Manners (1777–1816) on 15 August 1802 in London. Lady Louisa was the fifth daughter of John Manners, MP, and Louisa Tollemache, 7th Countess of Dysart. The new duchess was said to have been "one of the brightest stars in the fashionable hemisphere" in the early years of her marriage. Together, they had one child:

- Aubrey Beauclerk, 7th Duke of St Albans (1815–1816), who died in infancy.

Lord St Albans died on 12 August 1815, four months after the birth of his heir, the 7th Duke. His widow and son both died on 19 February 1816 (at the home of her sister, the former Lady Laura Manners, wife of John Dalrymple, 7th Earl of Stair, in Portman Square, London) and the titles were inherited by the 6th Duke's younger brother William, who became the 8th Duke of St Albans, who had thirteen children.

Parliament of Great Britain
Preceded by Samuel Thornton; Walter Spencer Stanhope	Member of Parliament for Kingston upon Hull; 1790–1796; With: Samuel Thornton	Succeeded by Samuel Thornton; Sir Charles Turner
Peerage of England
Preceded by Aubrey Beauclerk	Duke of St Albans; 1802–1815	Succeeded by Aubrey Beauclerk
