= SS Braemar Castle =

Three steamships of the Castle Line or Union-Castle Line carried the name Braemar Castle.

- SS Braemar Castle (1898), in service 1898–1924
- SS Braemar Castle (1943), in service 1949–50
- SS Braemar Castle (1952), in service 1952–66
