= John Manners Tollemache =

British gentleman and politician

John Manners Tollemache (c. 1768 – 13 February 1837), born John Manners, was a British gentleman and politician. He was the second son of John Manners and Louisa Tollemache, 7th Countess of Dysart.

Through the interest of his elder brother, Sir William Manners, 1st Baronet, he was returned as Member of Parliament for Ilchester from 1804 until 1806.

On 19 August 1806, he married Mary Bechenoe (d. 1838), but the couple had no children.

Parliament of the United Kingdom
Preceded by Charles Brooke; Sir William Manners, Bt	Member of Parliament for Ilchester; 1804–1806; With: Charles Brooke	Succeeded by Sir William Manners, Bt; Nathaniel Saxon
