= Leone Sextus Tollemache =

British soldier (1884–1917)

- Portrait photo, undated
- Born: 10 June 1884
- Died: 20 February 1917 (aged 32)
- Burial place: Communal war cemetery, Dernancourt, France
- Alma mater: Royal Military College, Sandhurst
- Spouse: Kathleen Mary Mills
- Military career
- Allegiance: United Kingdom
- Branch: British Army
- Rank: Brigade Major
- Known for: Unusual name

Leone Sextus Denys Oswolf Fraudatifilius Tollemache-Tollemache de Orellana Plantagenet Tollemache-Tollemache (/ˈtuːlmeɪk ˈtɒlmæk/ TOOL-mayk-TOL-mak; 10 June 1884 – 20 February 1917) was a captain in the British Army who died during the First World War.

== Biography ==
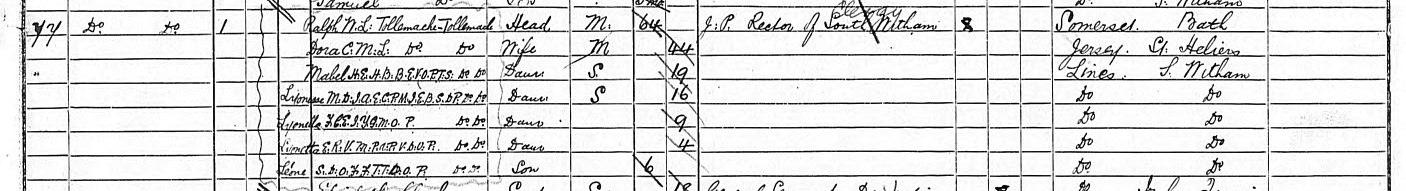
Extract from 1891 Census return for South Witham, Lincolnshre showing the Tollemache family. Leone is recorded as "Leone S. D. O. F. F. T. T. D. O. P.", in the second line from below.

Leone was born in Lincolnshire, the sixth son of the eccentric clergyman Ralph Tollemache-Tollemache. He was the eighth of Ralph's many children by his second wife, Dora Cleopatra Maria Lorenza de Orellana. His father gave him, in common with his many brothers and sisters, an unconventional name.

His surname at birth was "Tollemache-Tollemache", his father having doubled his original surname, "Tollemache", in 1876 after his second marriage. "de Orellana" derives from the naming customs of Spain, where his mother came from, and is a forename rather than part of his surname. The first "Tollemache-Tollemache" also seems to be an unusual forename. Leone was Ralph's sixth son, hence "Sextus". "Fraudatifilius" is Latin for "son of the defrauded one". "Leone" repeats a pattern seen in the names of his elder brothers and sisters (Lyonel, Lyonesse, Lyulph, Lyona, Leo, Lyonella and Lyonetta). His first five initials, "LSD OF", may include a reference to the divisions of the pre-decimal British currency, £sd, for pounds, shillings, and pence followed by half-pence (ob., "obol") and farthings (i.e., quarter-pence). This may be a reference to a financial dispute between his father Ralph and Ralph's first wife's trustees which had driven him bankrupt in 1863. Similarly, an elder brother was named Lyulph Ydwallo Odin Nestor Egbert Lyonel Toedmag Hugh Erchenwyne Saxon Esa Cromwell Orma Nevill Dysart Plantagenet Tollemache-Tollemache—his first 15 initials spell "LYONEL THE SECOND". In practice, Leone shortened his name to "Leone Sextus Tollemache".

He joined the British Army, attending the Royal Military College, Sandhurst, in 1902. He was commissioned into the Leicestershire Regiment in 1903. Before the First World War, he served in British India and at Fermoy in Ireland.

He married an Irishwoman, Kathleen Mary Mills (daughter of Joseph Mills and Charlotte née Bloomfield), at Acomb, North Yorkshire on 23 April 1914. They honeymooned in Fermoy. Their son, Denys Herbert George, was born on 12 January 1915 in White House in Acomb; Kathleen died in childbirth.

On the outbreak of the First World War, he was sent to France on the Union-Castle steamer SS Braemar Castle in September 1914. He kept a personal diary of his experiences. In 1916, Leone was seconded to serve as brigade major in the 3rd Australian Infantry Brigade of the 1st Australian Division after it was redeployed from Gallipoli to the Somme. He died on active service on 20 February 1917 from double pneumonia. He is buried in the communal war cemetery in Dernancourt near Albert.

Leone's elder brother Leo (Quintus Tollemache-Tollemache de Orellana Plantagenet) also served in France, in the 1st Battalion of the Lincolnshire Regiment. He went missing, presumed killed, on 1 November 1914 and his body was never found. He is commemorated on the Menin Gate memorial.

== See also ==
- Hubert Blaine Wolfeschlegelsteinhausenbergerdorff Sr., an American typesetter with an unusually long name.
