= Buckminster =

Village in Leicestershire, England

Coordinates: 52.793073°N 0.701477°W

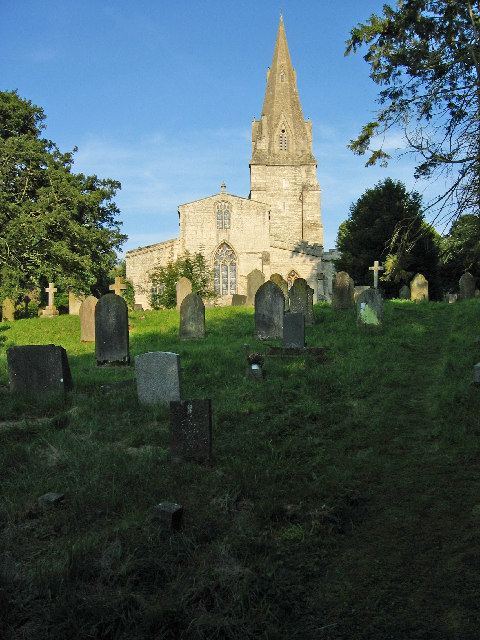
- Church of St John the Baptist, Buckminster

- Location within Leicestershire
- Population: 335 (2021)
- OS grid reference: SK875225
- Civil parish: Buckminster
- District: Melton
- Shire county: Leicestershire
- Region: East Midlands
- Country: England
- Sovereign state: United Kingdom
- Post town: GRANTHAM
- Postcode district: NG33
- Dialling code: 01476
- Police: Leicestershire
- Fire: Leicestershire
- Ambulance: East Midlands
- UK Parliament: Melton and Syston

Buckminster is a village and civil parish within the Melton district of Leicestershire, England, which includes the two villages of Buckminster and Sewstern. The total population of the civil parish was 335 at the 2021 census. It is on the B676 road, 10 miles east of Melton Mowbray and 4 miles west of the A1 at Colsterworth.

The parish is located in the north-east of the county, on the border with Lincolnshire. Nearby places are Coston, Wymondham and Sproxton in Leicestershire, and Stainby over the border in Lincolnshire. Sewstern Lane, which forms the parish boundary and the county boundary with Lincolnshire is part of the modern Viking Way. The village is noted for its autumnal colours, with many trees in the grounds and on the perimeter of Buckminster Park, on the village green, behind the houses of The Crescent and along the edges of roads and fields.

== Housing ==
Buckminster's houses reflect its history as an estate village. They include a terrace of 17 houses built in the 1810s (The Row), an attractive circlet of semi-detached properties standing in large gardens (The Crescent) and two short terraces built in 1935 and 1948 on Sproxton Road and Coston Road. There are also a small number of detached 19th-century houses, some with origins as farmhouses. A few of the older properties are built in limestone, but the predominant building material is brick. All the commercial and residential properties in the village are owned by Buckminster Estates, who are linked with the Tollemache family who live in Buckminster Park: the former home of the Earl of Dysart. The village pub is called the Tollemache Arms.

== Buckminster Park ==
Buckminster Park stands to the north-east of the village. It was never a medieval hunting park, but has its origins in a lease of land in 1532 near the former manor house. Buckminster Hall, a large Palladian-style property, was built within the park in the 1790s for Sir William Manners. This was demolished in 1951. It was replaced in 1965 by a Neo-Georgian house, by Wills, Trenwith and Wills, known as Buckminster Park. The large stables, built around a courtyard for the 9th Earl of Dysart in the 1880s, stand to the south of the Park, and have been converted to housing.

The parish church of St John the Baptist was built during the 13th, 14th and 15th centuries and was restored and improved in 1883. It is a Grade I listed building.

== History ==
The village's name means 'the monastery church of Bucca'.

Buckminster stands 500 feet above sea level, with no higher ground between the village and The Wash, on the east coast, 37 miles away. A beacon was built during the Anglo-Spanish War of the 16th century, as part of a chain of beacons stretching from the Lincolnshire coast. Repairs were ordered in 1625, after the countries returned to war, when a 24-hour watch had to be maintained.

For most of its history Buckminster has been a small, agricultural village. Its character changed from the 1790s, when Sir William Manners decided to move to the village and built Buckminster Hall. Two large terraces were constructed between 1795 and 1820, known as Bull Row and Cow Row. These were let to tenants who worked across Sir William's estate in Leicestershire and Lincolnshire. Sir William's mother was Lady Louisa Talmash, who became the 7th Countess of Dysart in 1821, following the death of her brother. Sir William became the heir to the earldom, took the surname Talmash (later Tollemache) and the courtesy title Lord Huntingtower. His great-grandson, William Tollemache, 9th Earl of Dysart, who inherited in 1878, spent heavily on village improvements. These included the demolition of the Bull Row terrace and its replacement with higher-quality semi-detached family homes, the creation of reading rooms in 1886, which became Buckminster Institute in 1898 (the forerunner to the Village Hall), the restoration of St John the Baptist church and the building of a new village school.

Land to the south and east of Buckminster village was quarried for ironstone between 1948 and 1968 on a rolling opencast basis, with the fields returned to agricultural use within a season. The result can be seen in the landscape, with the fields in the quarried area, including around the school, lying some 7 to 15 feet below the level of other roads. The reinstatement of the land encouraged a switch from pastoral to arable farming.

An underground Royal Observer Corps (ROC) nuclear monitoring post opened in 1961. It was decommissioned in 1991, and has subsequently been restored as a heritage site.

The early 21st century has seen further changes, including the renovation of old buildings to create offices and the installation of fast broadband.

== Church and mausoleum ==
The village name suggests there may have been a minster church here, but no architectural or documentary evidence of one survives. The present Church of St John the Baptist, Buckminster was mostly built between 1250 and 1350, of limestone. Unusually, the tower and broach spire are above the eastern end of the south aisle. The exterior of the church is richly decorated with carvings, which include faces on the pinnacles and a carved frieze. Inside are carved corbels, and an unusual turret containing a newel-staircase at the south-east corner of the nave, which would have led to the rood loft, and still provides access to the bells.

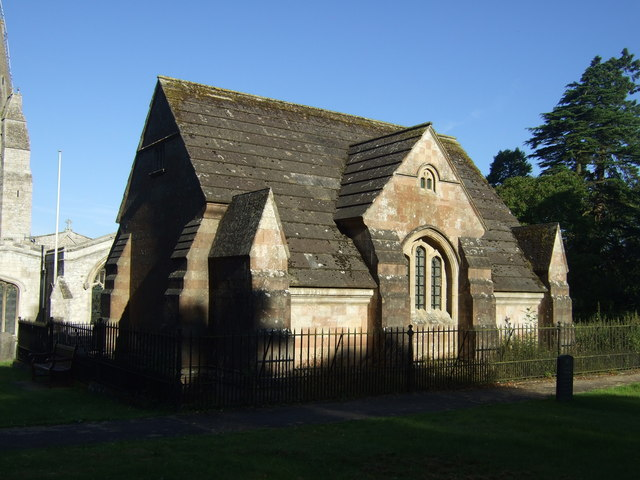
Dysart mausoleum

The Dysart mausoleum stands to the east of the church, and is surrounded by railings. It was designed by Halsey Ricardo and built by the trustees of the estate of Lionel Tollemache, 8th Earl of Dysart, who died in 1878. It is a Grade II* listed building.

== Facilities ==
There is a village shop on Main Street. The village hall was built in 2012, just off Main Street, and has generous parking for evening events. The Coffee Barn, at Buckminster Barn, offers light lunches, hot & cold beverages, is licensed for the sale of alcoholic drinks and also provides a venue for day conferences, weddings and other events. The Tollemache Arms, on Main Street, is a licensed premises and has a restaurant.

Buckminster Primary School is half a mile south of Buckminster village, on the road to Sewstern. It was rated as Good by Ofsted in 2014.

Buckminster Gliding Club, based at nearby Saltby Airfield, is named after the village. Buckminster United Football Club is an amateur football club based in the village.
