= Catherine Gray, Lady Manners =

Anglo-Irish aristocrat and poet

Catherine Rebecca Gray
- Lady Huntingtower
- Portrait of Lady Manners by Thomas Lawrence, 1794
- Born: 1766; Lehena, County Cork, Ireland
- Died: 21 March 1852 (aged 85–86)
- Spouse: William Tollemache, Lord Huntingtower (m. 1790; died 1833)
- Issue: Hon. Louisa Tollemache; Lady Catherine Camilla Tollemache; Lady Emily Frances Tollemache; Lionel Tollemache, 8th Earl of Dysart; Felix Tollemache; Hon. Arthur Caesar Tollemache; Hon. Caroline Tollemache; Lady Catherine Octavia Tollemache; Hugh Tollemache; Frederick Tollemache; Algernon Tollemache; Lady Laura Maria Tollemache
- Father: Francis Gray
- Mother: Elizabeth Ruddock

Catherine Rebecca Gray (or Grey), Lady Manners, later Lady Huntingtower (1766 – 21 March 1852) was an Anglo-Irish aristocrat and poet.

== Life ==
Catherine Gray was born in Lehena, County Cork, the daughter of Francis Gray and his wife, Elizabeth Ruddock, and was brought up in Cork, Ireland. In 1790 she married the Tory politician William Manners. The pair had six sons and six daughters. In 1794 she sat for Thomas Lawrence's Portrait of Lady Manners which was prominently displayed at the Royal Academy Exhibition of 1794. In 1821, the family surname was changed from Manners to Tollemache (also spelt Talmash). William died in 1833 and in 1840 their son Lionel inherited the Earldom of Dysart from his grandmother. All his siblings were raised to the precedence of the children of an earl, to reflect their father's position had he survived.

The first collection of poems under Lady Manners' own name was published in 1790, and their author was described as having "claims ... to the praise of harmony of verse and purity of sentiment ... not exceeded by those of any among her fair contemporaries". Her poetry was popular during the early nineteenth century.

== Works ==
- Poems by Lady Manners, 1793
- Review of Poetry, Ancient and Modern, A Poem, by Lady M****, 1799
