= William Tollemache, Lord Huntingtower (1820–1872) =

British nobleman and businessman

William Tollemache
- Born: 4 July 1820; England
- Died: 21 December 1872 (aged 52); England
- Spouse: Katherine Elizabeth Camilla Burke
- Partner(s): Elizabeth Acford; Emma Dibble
- Children: 13, including William Tollemache, 9th Earl of Dysart
- Parent: Lionel Tollemache, 8th Earl of Dysart

William Lionel Felix Tollemache, Lord Huntingtower (4 July 1820 – 21 December 1872) was a British nobleman and businessman.

== Biography ==
William was the child and heir apparent of Lionel Tollemache, 8th Earl of Dysart, and his wife Maria. He was described as, about 1861, a "tall, gaunt man, dark", about 5'10" or 6' in height.

Huntingtower was educated at Eton, which he left at the age of seventeen. His father refused to grant him any allowance whatsoever, and he received from his family only a few hundred pounds from his grandmother in the next four years. Unfortunately, his status as the heir of a large estate allowed him to borrow immense sums, and he led so dissipated a life as to accumulate, by 1841, £220,000 of debt. Among these debts was one of over £19,050 to a London diamond dealer, Dobson. Accordingly, he conveyed to Dobson, for a payment of just under £950, his interest in the family estates and eight life insurance policies, to be redeemable by paying his debt of £20,000.

At the cost of £3,500, Huntingtower succeeded in having himself returned as a Member of Parliament for Andover in the election of 1841; but lacking two days of his majority at the time of the election, was replaced by Lord William Paget.

Huntingtower attempted to make a living as a horse dealer and coach proprietor, but was declared bankrupt on 2 September 1842 and incarcerated in the Queen's Prison. Upon examination, the unfortunate Huntingtower was found to be unable to give an account of his assets, and quite unable to understand his accounts. One of his creditors, George Samuel Ford, a bill discounter and solicitor, attempted to have the fiat annulled on the grounds that Huntingtower had never been a trader so could not be declared a bankrupt. He failed on a technicality.

In 1844, Lord Huntingtower molested or seduced Elizabeth Acford, a maid in the service of his mother, Lady Dysart, and subsequently took her as his mistress. After living together in Scotland, which Acford thought was sufficient to establish a marriage there, they returned and lived several years in England. Acford bore three of Huntingtower's children at this time:

- Frances Elizabeth Acford (10 September 1845 – ?)
- Elizabeth Frances Acford (21 November 1846 – ?)
- Caroline Acford (14 January 1848 – ?)

Huntingtower and Acford fell out in early 1848, and he confiscated various letters from her. His financial troubles had resumed again. In October 1848, he deserted her. Acford, destitute, appealed to Lady Dysart for support, which she could only obtain in return for her silence; but eventually this, too, stopped, and Acford was forced upon the relief of the parish in 1850.

On 26 September 1851, Huntingtower married his first cousin, Katherine Elizabeth Camilla Burke (d. 1896), the daughter of Sir Joseph Burke, 11th Baronet, at East Horrington church in Somerset. They had four children:

- Hon. Mary Louisa Napoleona Manners Tollemache (21 December 1852 – 20 June 1859)
- Lady Agnes Mary Manners Tollemache (27 June 1855 – 27 July 1912), married Charles Norman Lindsay Scott on 4 February 1882, by whom she had one daughter, Wenefryde Scott, 10th Countess of Dysart
- Lady Agatha Manners Tollemache (16 January 1857 – 8 June 1941), married Richard Bethell, 3rd Baron Westbury on 24 July 1882
- William Tollemache, 9th Earl of Dysart (1859–1935)

On 21 March 1881, the two surviving daughters, Agnes and Agatha, were granted a warrant of precedence as the daughters of an earl.

In 1853, after the death of Dobson, Huntingtower's assignees in bankruptcy sued to overturn the mortgage on the estates and recover the policies, and were successful in having the transaction nullified by the Court of Chancery as a fraud upon Lord Huntingtower. In this year, he was again confronted by his mistress, Elizabeth Acford, who had learned of his marriage to Katherine Burke. In the following year, he agreed to pay Acford an annuity of 60 pounds in return for the surrender of his remaining letters. Huntingtower now resumed relations with her, and she bore two more children by Huntingtower:

- Charles Frederick William Acford (4 April 1858 – 1858)
- Albert Edwin Acford (15 February 1863 – ?)

In 1860, Huntingtower left Katherine, and subsequently took another mistress, Emma Dibble. He had four children by her:

- John Manners
- Emma Teresa Manners
- Magdalen Manners
- Russell Joseph Manners

In 1865, Elizabeth sued him for the payment of her annuity, and Huntingtower successfully defended himself by claiming her to be his wife.

Huntingtower died in 1872. His father died in 1878; and a lawsuit was initiated in 1881 by Elizabeth Acford, seeking to have her son, Albert, recognised as Earl of Dysart, rather than William, Huntingtower's son by Katherine Burke. After reviewing the evidence, the Committee for Privileges concluded that the evidence presented disproved Acford's allegations that she had been married to Lord Huntingtower, and confirmed the succession of William as Earl of Dysart.
