= Louisa Tollemache, 7th Countess of Dysart =

English peeress (1745–1840)

The Right Honourable The Countess of Dysart
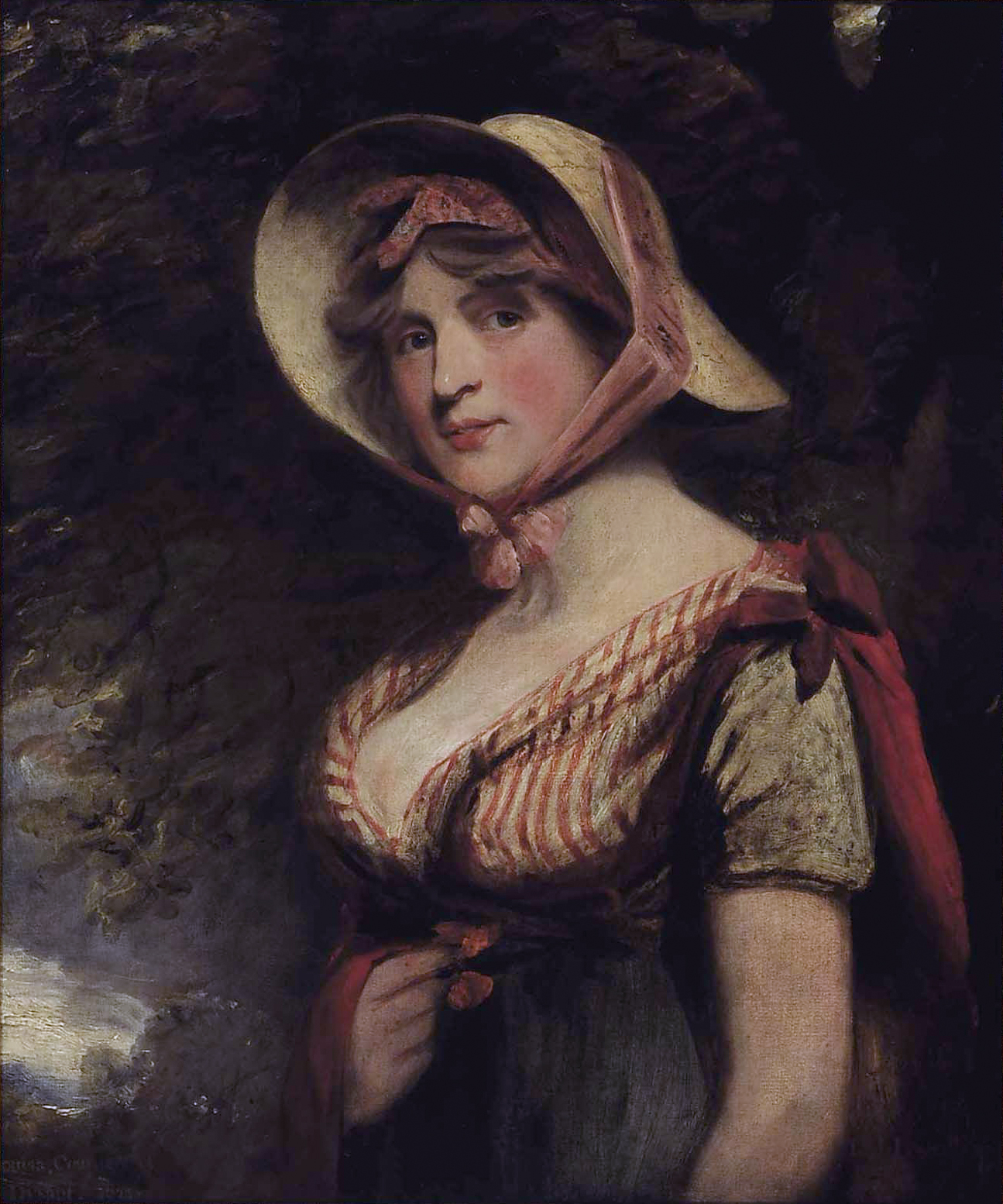
- Portrait by John Constable after John Hoppner
- Born: 2 July 1745; England
- Died: 22 September 1840 (aged 95); Ham House, London
- Children: 10, including William, John and Louisa

Louisa Manners Tollemache, 7th Countess of Dysart (2 July 1745 – 22 September 1840) was an English peeress. Her father held considerable estates in England largely due to the two marriages of Elizabeth Maitland, Duchess of Lauderdale, earlier Tollemache, née Elizabeth Murray. Her elder brothers left no surviving issue on their deaths which enabled her to enjoy and help to pass on to her descendants the key family settlement properties: Helmingham Hall and Ham House in England.

== Family and early life ==
She was one of the daughters of Lionel Tollemache, 4th Earl of Dysart, the second of three who survived to adulthood. She and her younger sister, Jane, were educated at Mrs Holt's School for Girls in South Audley Street, Mayfair.

== Marriage and issue ==
The Lady Louisa married John Manners in 1765, the couple having eloped to Scotland from Ham House and Manners having thrown the key to the garden door back over the wall to prevent her from returning. At her father's request the marriage was repeated at St James's Church, Piccadilly. The marriage occurred 11 years into the 20 years of service for which Manners, fifteen years her senior, is mainly remembered, as MP for Newark, Nottinghamshire for 18 years; in the midst of decades of return of the Manners family as co-incumbents for then two-member parliamentary constituency. Her husband succeeded his father in 1772, inheriting Hanby Hall in Lincolnshire and the Buckminster estate in Leicestershire.

The couple lived most of their 27-year-marriage, ended by his death in 1792, at Ham House, spending time at the other senior Tollemache family home of Helmingham Hall in Suffolk.

They had ten children:

1. William Tollemache, Lord Huntingtower (1766–1833) who, on 12 January 1790, married Catherine Rebecca Gray (d. 1852). They had six sons (including Hon. Lionel Tollemache, 8th Earl of Dysart (1794–1878)) and six daughters.
2. Hon. John Manners Tollemache of Portman Square, was authorised by royal licence, dated 6 April 1821, to take the surname of Tollemache instead of Manners and bear the family arms. He died without issue (s. p.) at York House, Twickenham, Middlesex, 13 February 1837. Married, 19 August 1806, Mary, daughter of Captain Benjamin Bechinoe, R.N., and widow of William Bellenden-Ker, 4th Duke of Roxburghe. She died in April 1838.
3. Hon. Charles Manners-Tollemache (2 January 1775 – 26 July 1850), of Market Overton, Rutland, and Harrington, Northamptonshire; was authorised by royal licence, dated 6 April 1821, to take the surname of Tollemache instead of Manners, and bear the arms of Tollemache. He died in Eaton Place, London, 26 July 1850, having married, first, at St George's, Hanover Square, 4 August 1797, Frances, only daughter of William Hay, of Newhall, and niece of George, seventh Marquess of Tweeddale; she, who was born 1775, died 29 March 1801, and was buried at Helmingham 10 April. They had issue:
  1. Arthur Hugh, born 23 April 1799; died 11 December 1870.
  2. Wilbraham Francis, born 26 April 1800; Commander in the Royal Navy; died 6 January 1864; married, 5 October 1841, Elizabeth, eldest daughter of Alexander Munro, and by her, who died 13 October 1883, had issue.
  3. Louisa Grace, died young.

He married, secondly, at St George's, Hanover Square on 8 August 1803, Gertrude Florinda, daughter of Gen. William Gardiner (brother of Luke Gardiner, 1st Viscount Mountjoy), and the widow of Charles John Clarke; with whom he had further issue:

4. Charles William.
5. George.
6. Lionel, born 1806; captain 76th Foot; died at Fort George, Inverness, on 6 February 1838.
7. William (7 November 1810–17 March 1886); married, first, at Leamington Spa on 13 September 1838, Anna Maria Jane, third daughter of Edward St Maur, 11th Duke of Somerset, K.G., by whom he had issue; she died 23 September 1873. He married, secondly, 11 May 1875, Emma, daughter of James Sidney of Richmond Hill, and widow of Major-General Sir Herbert Benjamin Edwardes, K.C.B., K.C.S.I.
8. Henry Bertie, served in the Scots Fusilier Guards; died 28 October 1886; married, at St. George's, Hanover Square, 12 August 1837, his cousin Emilia Magdalen Louisa, eldest daughter of Sir George Sinclair, 2nd Baronet, by Catherine Camilla Manners, and by her had issue. This marriage was dissolved by the Court of Session in Scotland 3 July 1841, and afterwards, 9 July 1859, by the English Courts. She remarried in 1841.
9. Frances Louisa, born 23 September 1804. died 15 April 1893, and was buried in the churchyard of Petersham, Surrey; married, first, 1 June 1850, to Lieutenant George Richard Halliday, R.N., of Bridgefield, who died 11 November 1855; she was married, secondly, 28 November 1857, to her cousin the Hon. Algernon Gray Tollemache, who died 16 January 1892.
10. Maria Eliza, born 27 October 1809, died 7 May 1893. For many years Maria lived with Louisa, her grandmother, as a companion at Ham House. She was married in the private chapel of Ham House on 20 August 1833, as second wife to Charles, first Marquess of Ailesbury, K.T., 37 years her senior. He died on 4 January 1856, and she survived him by 37 years. She was a friend of Queen Victoria and Alexandra, Princess of Wales.

4. George, died an infant.
5. Elizabeth Louisa, died an infant.
6. Sophia, died an infant.
7. Catherine Sophia, born 1769; died in Grosvenor Square 28 May 1825; married at St. George's, Hanover Square, 16 August 1793, to Sir Gilbert Heathcote, 4th Baronet MP for County Rutland, who died 26 March 1851, and by whom she had issue.
8. Maria Caroline, born 1775; died at Edinburgh 20 December 1805, and was buried at Helmingham 4 January 1806; married, 9 September 1799, at St. James's, Westminster, to James, Viscount Macduff, afterwards fourth Earl Fife, in the Peerage of Ireland, K.T., they had no issue.
9. Louisa Grace, born 1777; died 19 February 1816, and was buried at Hanworth; married, at St George's, Hanover Square, 15 August 1802, as his second wife, to Aubrey Beauclerk, 6th Duke of St Albans, by whom she had an only son, Aubrey, who became the 7th Duke of St Albans.
10. Laura (1780–1834); married, 3 June 1808, to John William Henry Dalrymple, afterwards seventh Earl of Stair, which marriage was dissolved 16 July 1811 owing to a prior contract on 28 May 1804 between Mr Dalrymple and Johanna, daughter of Charles Gordon of Oluny, but this contract was annulled in June 1820 by the Lords of Session in Edinburgh. By royal licence dated 13 March 1821 she was authorised to take and bear the surname and arms of Tollemache instead of those of Manners, and was then described as unmarried. She died at Ham House, without issue, dependent upon the friendship of her companion, Jane Beauchamp. For about 20 years she retired to Hanworth Park with her dogs and her parrot and the occasional company of some children, her youngest nieces and nephews.

== Art ==
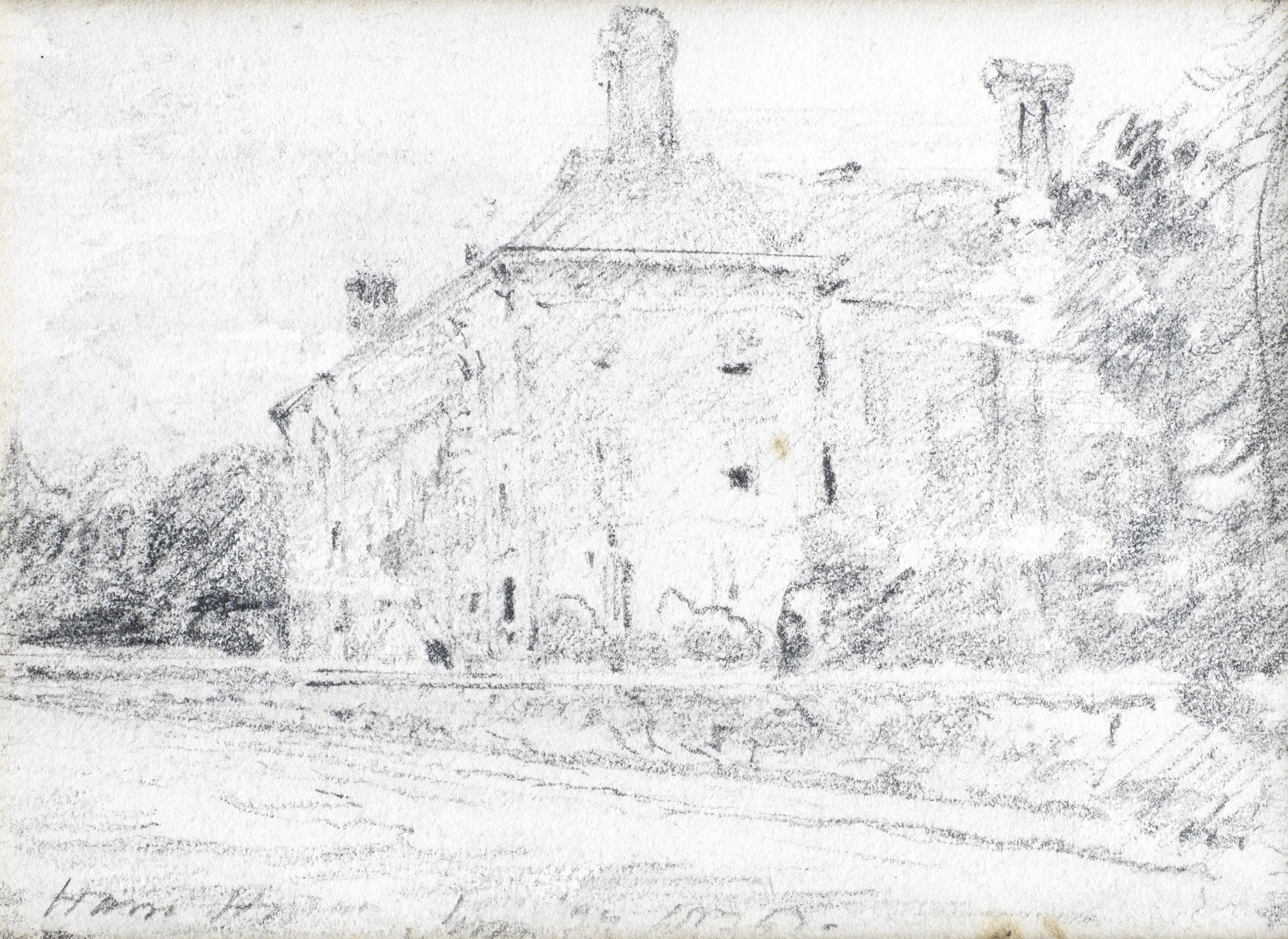
John Constable's sketch of Ham House, June 1835

A portrait of Louisa by Sir Joshua Reynolds was engraved by Valentine Green, and another by Hoppner, as a peasant, has also been engraved. Hoppner's portrait was sold at Messrs. Robinson and Fisher's rooms for 14,050 guineas on 27 June 1901. This portrait originally belonged to Louisa's daughter, Lady Laura Tollemache, from whom it passed to Louisa's granddaughter, Maria, Marchioness of Ailesbury, and finally came into the possession of the latter's daughter-in-law, the Lady Charles Bruce, by whose executors it was sold. Thomas Lawrence's portrait of Lady Louisa was exhibited at the Royal Academy in 1794. Louisa was a notable patron of John Constable, entertaining him at Helmingham, Ham House and London residences at Pall Mall and in Piccadilly. Constable's letters make several references to Lady Dysart and he was evidently at ease with the family. Louisa employed his brother, Golding Constable, as gamekeeper at Helmingham. Constable painted copies of Reynolds' and Hoppner's works, including a portrait of Louisa dated 1823. Others to derive works from Hoppner, Lawrence and Reynolds portraits of Louisa include Henry Bone, Charles Knight and Richard Smythe.

== Title ==
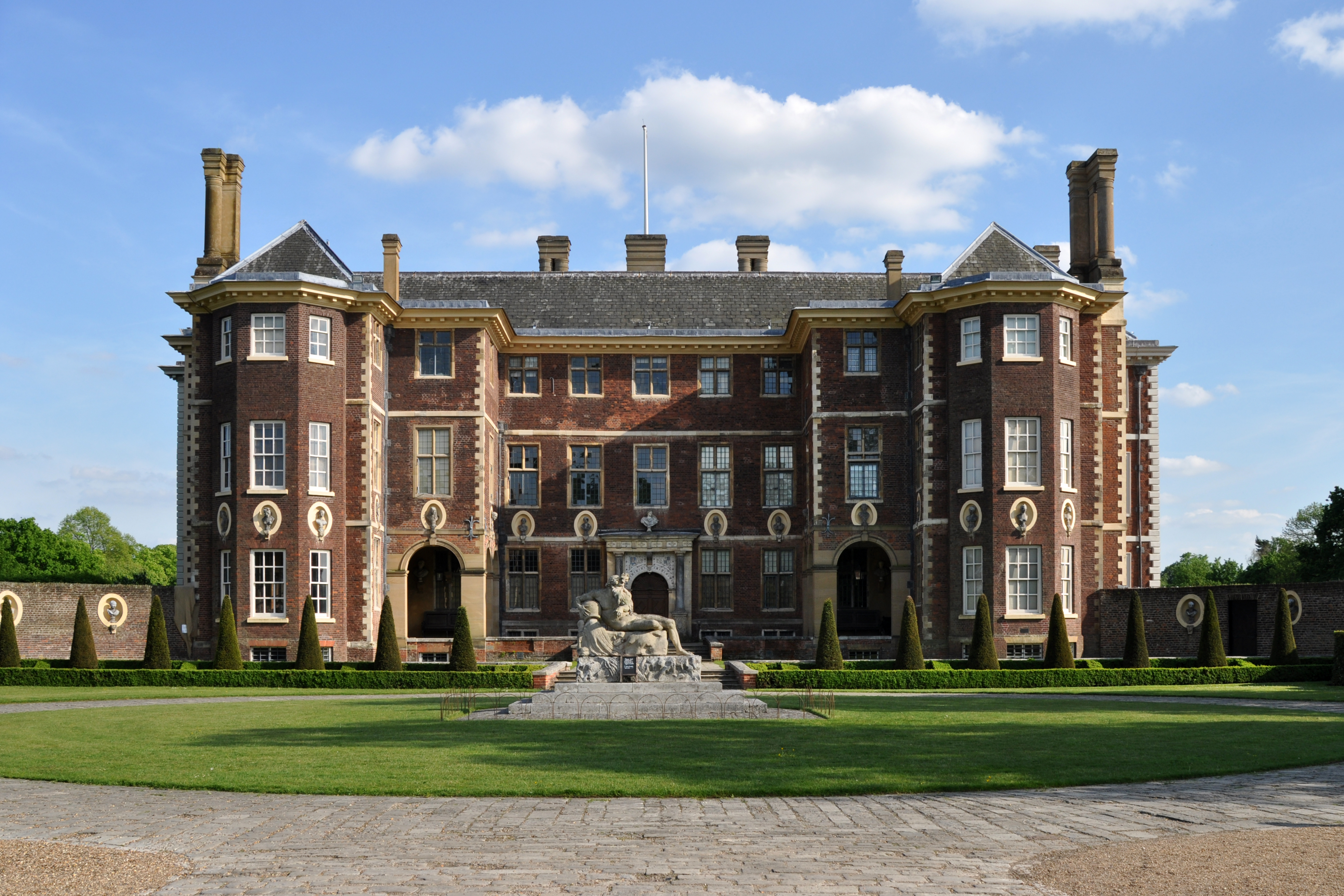
Ham House

The death of John Manners on 23 September 1792, when Louisa was 47, brought the 30,000 acres (12,000 ha) of the Manners' Buckminster estate into the Tollemache family. She succeeded her brother Wilbraham in the earldom of Dysart and barony of Huntingtower on 9 March 1821, aged 75, and on 13 March 1821 she, together with her only unmarried daughter, Laura, was authorised by royal licence to take and bear the surname and arms of Tollemache instead of Manners.

Her major inheritance in 1821 had appeared unlikely given her many elder siblings in her younger years. In her middle-age she still had three elder siblings who might have been expected to have had progeny to whom the family title and estates could be passed. However, her eldest surviving-to-adulthood brother Lionel Tollemache, 5th Earl of Dysart had died in 1799 aged 64 with no heirs and her brother Wilbraham Tollemache, 6th Earl of Dysart died in 1821 aged 81, also without any legitimate heirs. Her elder sister Frances also died without surviving children. Thus Louisa, long widowed, came into a substantial inheritance at the age of 75.

The Tollemache baronetcy became extinct, but Louisa succeeded to the Earldom of Dysart as the 7th Countess of Dysart in her own right. The estates were divided between her and her younger sister, Lady Jane, with Louisa inheriting Ham House and the surrounding estates in Ham, Petersham and Canbury and Jane receiving Helmingham, Suffolk, Cheshire and Northants. Both families took the name of Tollemache.

== Death and succession ==
Increasingly blind in her old age, Louisa died at Ham House, Ham, Surrey on 22 September 1840, aged 95, and was buried at Helmingham on 8 October. She survived her husband by more than half her lifetime and all of her children except her third, Charles. Her will was proved in February 1841. She was succeeded by her grandson, Lionel Tollemache, 8th Earl of Dysart, son of William, Lord Huntingtower.

== Sources ==
Attribution

Peerage of Scotland
Preceded by Wilbraham Tollemache	Countess of Dysart; 1821–1840	Succeeded by Lionel Tollemache
