= Lyonel Tollemache =

English Baronet

Sir Lyonel Tollemache Bt
- Born: Lyonel Felix Carteret Eugene Tollemache; 15 January 1854; Grantham
- Died: 4 March 1952 (aged 98); Ham, London
- Title: 4th Baronet, of Hanby Hall
- Predecessor: William Tollemache, 9th Earl of Dysart
- Spouse: Hersilia Henrietta Diana Oliphant Collingwood (m. 1881)
- Children: 6
- Parent(s): Ralph Tollemache and Caroline Tollemache

Sir Lyonel Felix Carteret Eugene Tollemache, 4th Baronet (15 January 1854 – 4 March 1952) was an English landowner.

== Early life and family ==
Born in South Witham near Grantham, Lincolnshire, he was the eldest son of the Reverend Ralph Tollemache and his first wife and cousin, Caroline Tollemache.

Tollemache married Hersilia Henrietta Diana Oliphant (or Collingwood) in 1881 and they had three daughters and three sons, all born in Eastbourne:

- Cecil Lyonel Newcomen Tollemache, 5th Baronet
- Beryl Hersilia Tollemache (1887 – 8 June 1944)
- Cynthia Joan Caroline Tollemache (1890 – 31 January 1988)
- Lieutenant John Eadred Tollemache (28 July 1892 – 21 August 1916) B.A. Magdalene College, Cambridge. Joined the 6th Battalion The Queen's (Royal West Surrey Regiment) and died whilst attached to the 8th Battalion in the Somme.
- Sibell Agnes Tollemache (1895 – 7 June 1954)
- Maj.-Gen. Sir Humphrey Thomas Tollemache, 6th Baronet

== Baronetage ==
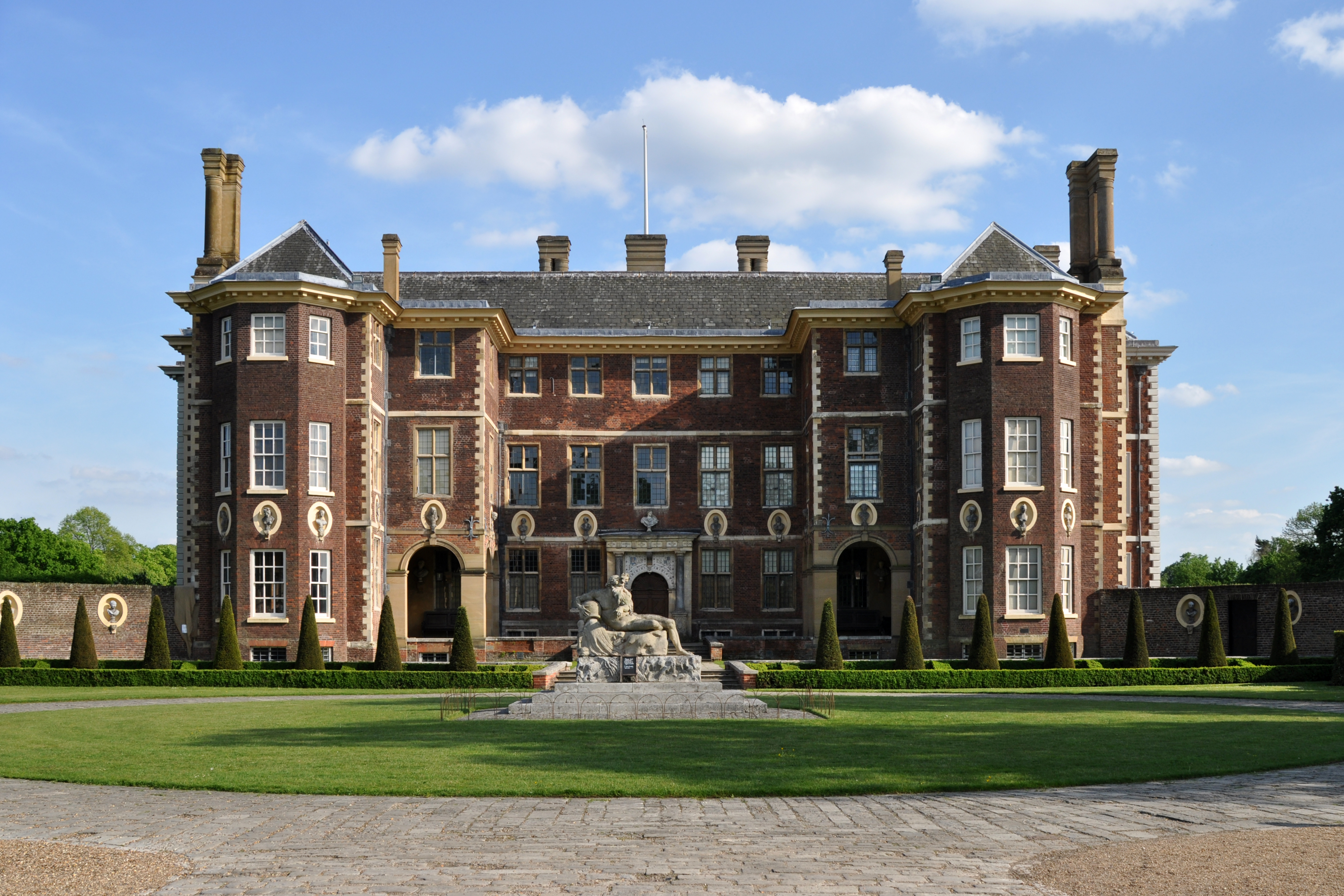
Ham House

On the death of his second cousin, William Tollemache, 9th Earl of Dysart, 3rd Baronet, he succeeded to the baronetage in 1935 at the age of 81. He inherited Dysart's holding in Buckminster estate and the entirety of Ham House with the surrounding land and property in Petersham, Ham and Canbury and the gravel works at Ham. Tollemache and his middle-aged bachelor son, Cecil, moved into Ham House. The Dysart title and other estates were passed to Dysart's niece, Wenefryde Scott.

== World War II ==
The father and son duo increasingly struggled to maintain Ham House, especially as the outbreak of war reduced the availability of labour. The nearby Leyland military vehicle and munitions factory was a local target and bombs fell near the house. Tollemache moved most of the valuable furniture and artworks from the house to the country for safekeeping. The family deeds and papers, some dating back to the 14th century, were placed in deep vaults in Chancery Lane. Although they survived the Blitz, they were damaged by flooding from fire hoses and were thought to have been destroyed. Many were recovered from the Ham House Stables in 1953 and transferred to The National Archives.

== Post-war ==
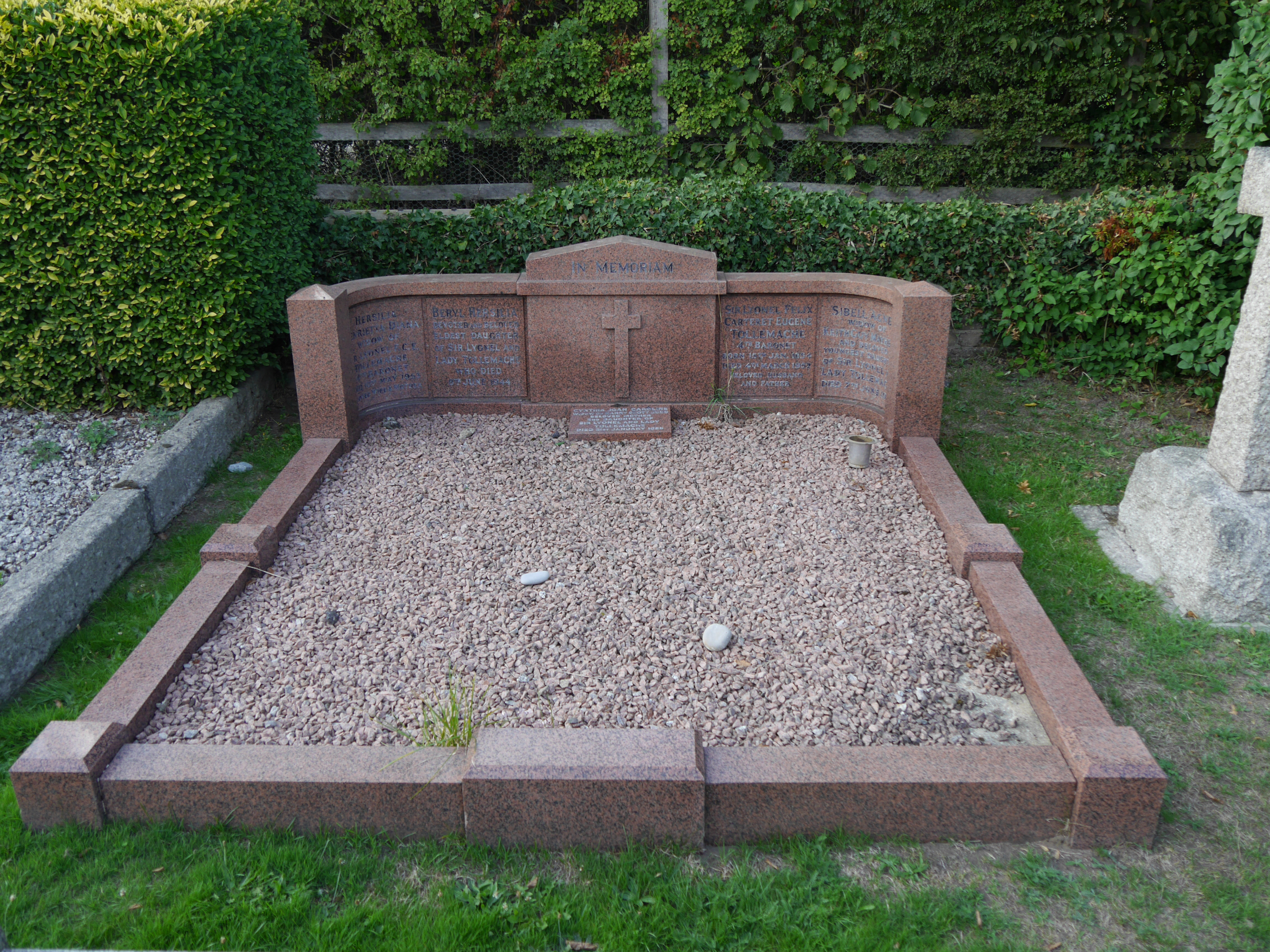
Funerary monument, St Peter's Church, Petersham

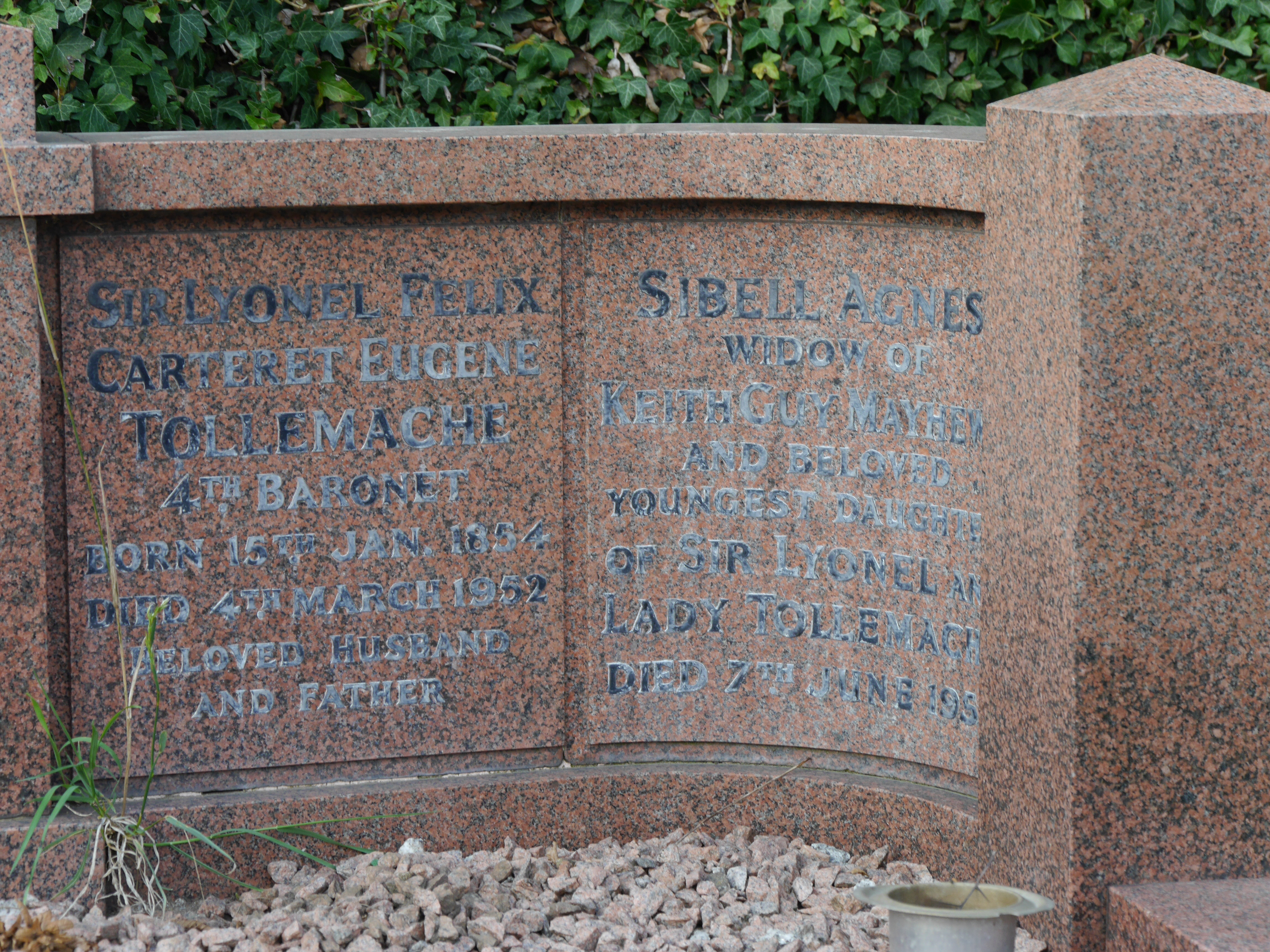
Funerary monument, St Peter's Church, Petersham

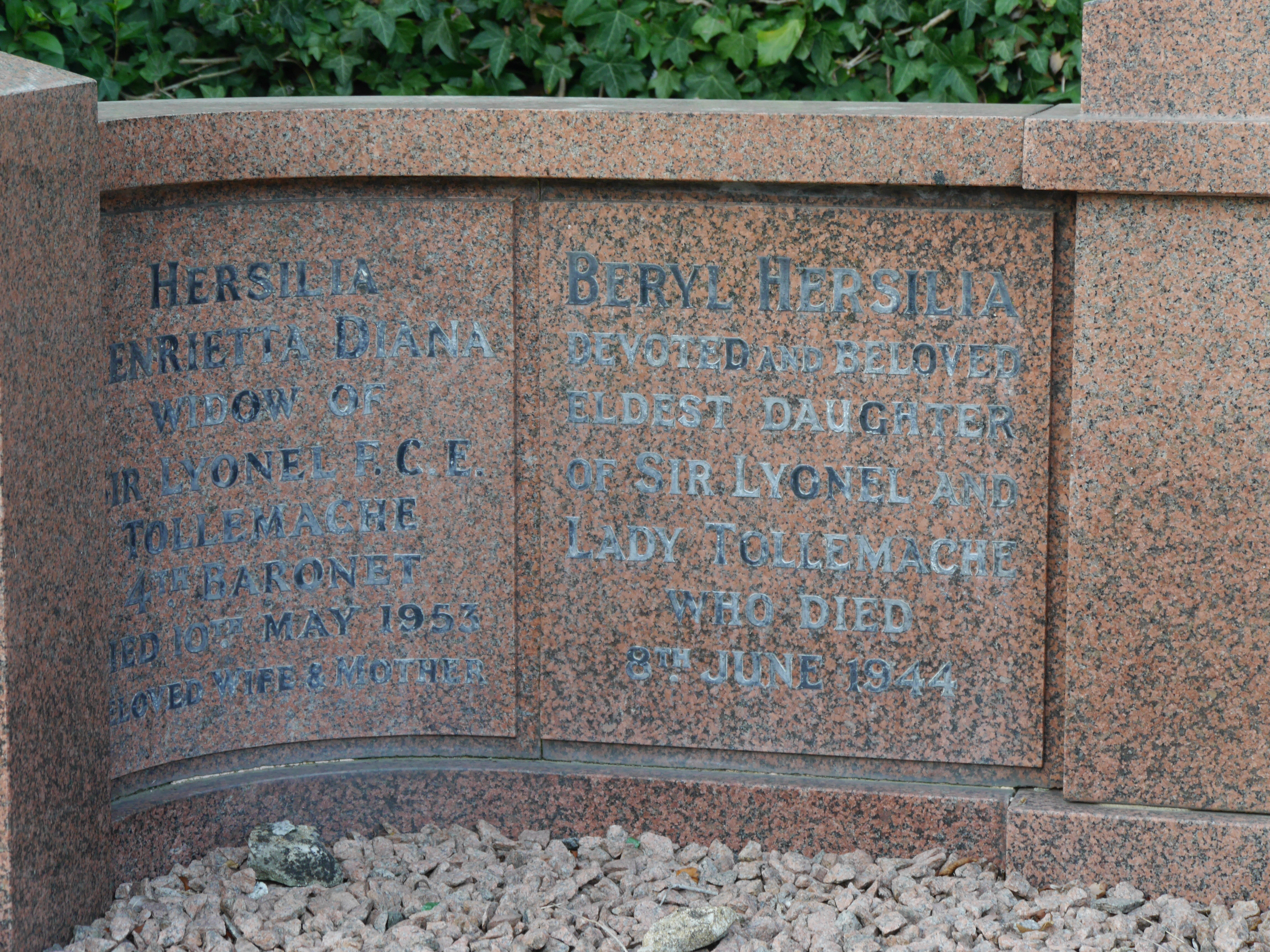
Funerary monument, St Peter's Church, Petersham

After the war, in 1948, Tollemache and his son donated Ham House and its gardens to the National Trust, a plan that had been under consideration since James Lees-Milne's visit in March 1943. Tollemache and his son moved to Langham House on Ham Common, one of the many Tollemache properties in the area. In 1949, Buckminster Estates Ltd, the Tollemache's company established in 1936, sold the remaining Tollemache interests in the area by auction in 124 lots comprising 350 acres (140 ha) land, 41 residences, 99 cottages, a farm, 4 shops, 2 licensed premises, freehold ground rents and building plots and the sand and gravel works. Lyonel remained in Langham House, Ham until his death in 1952. Hersilia died in 1953. The baronetage passed to Cecil, and, on his death, to the youngest son, Humphrey.

He is buried at St Peter's Church, Petersham.

== Lifeboat ==
In 1949, Sir Lyonel and Lady Tollemache gifted the cost of the new Eastbourne lifeboat to the Royal National Lifeboat Institution (RNLI). At a ceremony on the 14 July 1949, the lifeboat was named Beryl Tollemache (ON 859), in memory of their daughter. The lifeboat served at Eastbourne until 1977, launching 176 times, and saving 154 lives.

Baronetage of Great Britain
Preceded by William Tollemache	Baronet (of Hanby Hall); 1935–1952	Succeeded by Cecil Tollemache
