= Felix Tollemache =

British gentleman and Tory politician

Felix Thomas Tollemache

Member of Parliament for Ilchester
- In office 1827–1830
- Preceded by: Richard Sharp; John WIlliams
- Succeeded by: Michael Bruce; James Vere

Personal details
- Born: 16 February 1796
- Died: 5 October 1843 (aged 47)
- Party: Tory
- Spouse(s): Sarah Gray (m. 1825; died 1831) Frances Julia Peters (m. 1833)
- Children: William James Felix Tollemache; Caroline Tollemache; Granville Gray Tollemache
- Parents: William Tollemache, Lord Huntingtower (father); Catherine Gray (mother)

Felix Thomas Tollemache (16 Feb 1796 – 5 October 1843) was a British gentleman and Tory politician. He was the second son of William Tollemache, Lord Huntingtower and Catherine Gray.

On 1 October 1825, he married Sarah Gray (1805–1831), by whom he had three children:

- William James Felix Tollemache (12 January 1827 – 3 November 1859)
- Caroline Tollemache (7 June 1828 – 6 June 1867), married on 15 February 1853, her first cousin, Rev. Ralph Tollemache
- Granville Gray Tollemache (b. 21 September 1830), died young

At the 1826 general election, he stood in Ilchester, along with his older brother Lionel. Neither brother was elected. However, the result was overturned on a petition in 1827. The brothers served as Members of Parliament (MPs) for Ilchester until they were defeated in the 1830 general election.

On 27 April 1833, he married again, to Frances Julia Peters, but had no children by her.

== Sources ==
- Descendants of Sir Robert de Manners, of Etal

Parliament of the United Kingdom
Preceded by Richard Sharp; John Williams	Member of Parliament for Ilchester; 1827 – 1830; With: Lionel Tollemache	Succeeded by Michael Bruce; James Joseph Hope Vere
