= William Tollemache, 9th Earl of Dysart =

English peer and judicial officer (1859-1935)

The Right Honourable The Earl of Dysart DL
- Born: 3 March 1859
- Died: 22 November 1935 (aged 76)
- Spouse: Cecilia Florence (m. 1885; died 1917)
- Parents: William Tollemache, Lord Huntingtower (father); Katherine Elizabeth Camilla Burke (mother)

William John Manners Tollemache, 9th Earl of Dysart, DL (3 March 1859 – 22 November 1935) was an English peer and judicial officer.

== Early life and family ==
William Tollemache was the eldest son of a controversial father, William Tollemache, Lord Huntingtower, who had accrued huge debt on the strength of his anticipated, but unfulfilled, inheritance.

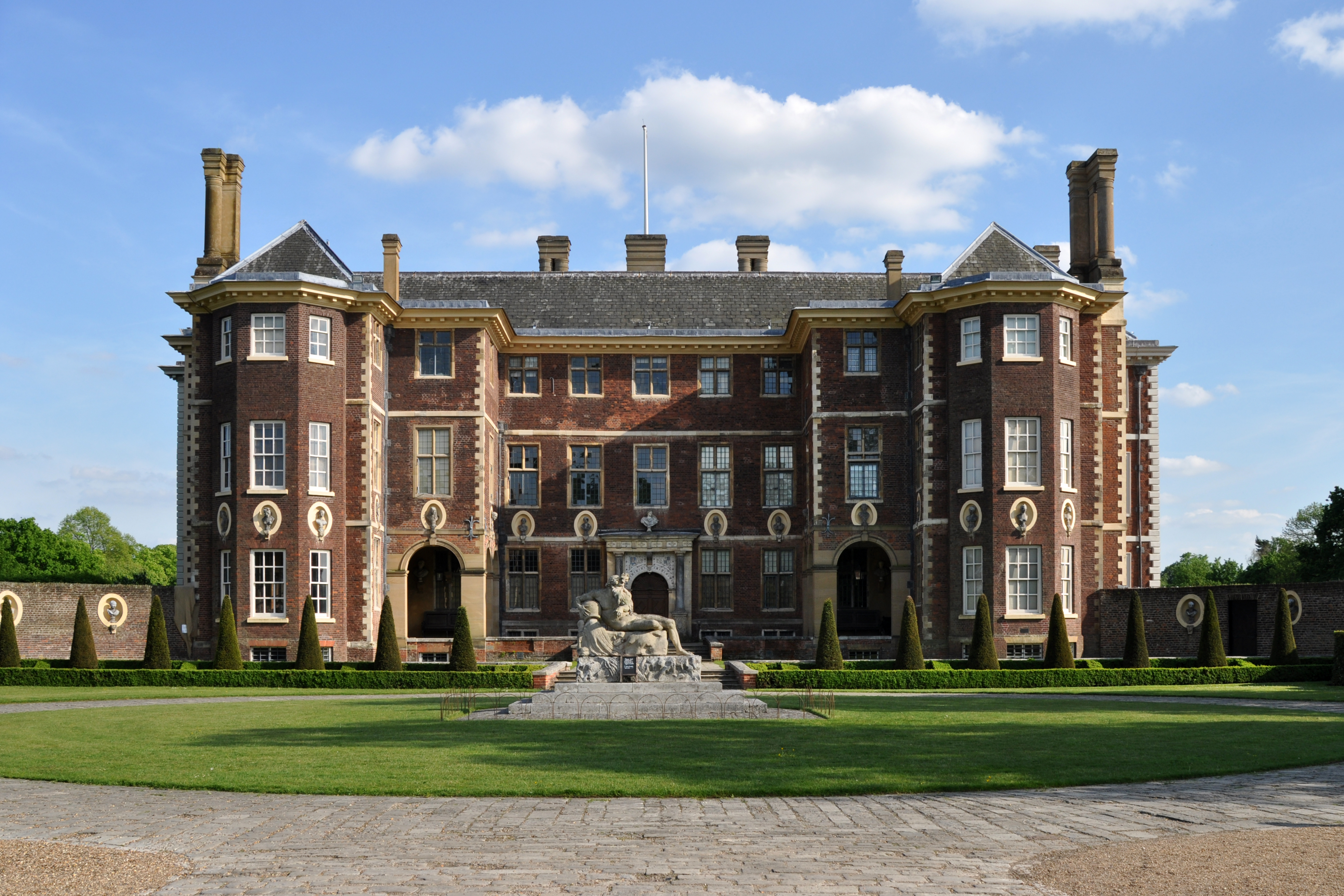
Ham House, Richmond, London

William had three elder half-sisters by his father's previous relationship with a servant, Elizabeth Acford. He also had three elder sisters by Huntingtower's wife and first cousin, Katherine Elizabeth Camilla Burke. His father subsequently resumed relations with Acford, and William and his sisters gained two younger half-brothers. After 1860, William gained four more siblings, two half-brothers and two half-sisters, from his father's later relationship with Emma Dibble.

== Dysart Trustees ==
Lord Huntingtower, William's father, died on 21 December 1872 when William was aged 13, leaving substantial debts and claims against the family as a result. William's grandfather, Lionel Tollemache, 8th Earl of Dysart, died on 23 September 1878 when William was aged 19. In a bid to protect the family fortune, Lionel left his estate to William to be held in trust for 21 years. The initial trustees were Lionel's brothers; Algernon Gray Tollemache and Frederick James Tollemache and Frederick's son-in-law; Charles Hanbury-Tracy, 4th Baron Sudeley.

Frederick died in 1889 and his trusteeship was replaced by Major-General Charles Edmund Webber (1838–1904). Algernon resigned in 1891 due to ill health and died soon after, his place being taken by Petersham banker, George Tournay Biddulph (1844–1929). Lord Sudeley resigned following bankruptcy in 1893, though he continued to live in Ham at Ormeley Lodge. His replacement from 14 April 1896 was the Hon. Stanhope Tollemache of North Leigh, Ipswich. The trusteeship ran from 1878 until 23 September 1899; however, the trustees continued to administer many of the various investments until William's tenant-in-tail reached majority in 1915. Shortly before William's death, with the agreement of his successor, management of the trustees' affairs and the Earl's interests in the Surrey, Lincolnshire and Leicestershire estates were conveyed to Buckminster Estates.

== Marriage ==
In late 1885 William married Cecilia Florence (1861–1917), daughter of George Onslow Newton, Esq., of Croxton Park, Cambridgeshire. They had no children. Lady Dysart left him sometime early in the 20th century, probably due to William's eccentric and cantankerous nature, and she lived separately in London. Upon her death he did not remarry.

== Interests ==
Lord Dysart's seats were Ham House, Petersham, Richmond, Surrey, and Buckminster Park, Leicestershire. Following the death of the 8th Earl, with the approval of the Trustees, William initiated restoration work to Ham House which had become dilapidated during his grandfather's time.

The Earl was born partially sighted and was blind for most of his life, but this did not prevent him from leading a highly active lifestyle. He travelled extensively, to Europe, Russia and Egypt. He also rode, with a leading rein held by a mounted groom, though he fell and dislocated his hip in 1908.

He was passionate about music, particularly German opera, went annually to the Bayreuth Festival and served as president of the London Wagner Society from 1884 until 1895. He commissioned the composer Ferdinand Praeger to write a biography of Richard Wagner – however the controversy arising on its publication in 1892 eventually led to him to resign the presidency of the Association.

He remained predominately at Ham, spending September to January at Buckminster for weekend shooting parties. Following his wife's departure, he was joined at Ham by his niece Mrs Hack and her daughters who acted as hostesses to the continuing series of social events held there. One of many such events held at Ham House was a coming-out ball for the daughter of his eldest sister, Agnes, Wenefryde Scott.

== Career ==
The estates were expanded under the trusteeship, the trustees aggressively buying property and land in and around Ham and Petersham eventually owning 70% of the area. With building land in demand as London expanded, and agriculture becoming relatively less commercially attractive, the Dysarts were eventually successful in extinguishing lammas rights on 176 acres (71 ha) of open farmland in Ham with the passage of the Richmond, Petersham and Ham Open Spaces Act in 1902. Instead of building though, much of the former lammas land was leased from 1904 to the Ham River Grit Company, and the area was exploited for gravel extraction to feed the demand from construction. The Dysarts holdings in the adjacent former manor of Canbury were extensively developed for housing as Kingston expanded northwards. Towards the end of World War I, the Dysarts sold some land in Ham to the Government for the construction of a National Aircraft Factory leased first to Sopwith Aviation Company and then to Leyland Motors, adding to local demand for housing.

== Death and succession ==
Upon his death, 22 November 1935, the Scottish peerage devolved upon his niece, Wenefryde Scott, while his British baronetcy was inherited by his second cousin Sir Lyonel Tollemache, 4th Baronet to whom Dysart bequeathed Ham House.

== Sources ==
- Nay, Jessica S. (2012). Rediscovering Pieces of the Past: The Manuscript Scores of Ferdinand Praeger , State University of New York at Buffalo Music Library, accessed 14 March 2015.

Honorary titles
Preceded by The Earl of Gainsborough	Lord Lieutenant of Rutland; 1881–1906	Succeeded by John Henry Brocklehurst
Peerage of Scotland
Preceded by Lionel Tollemache	Earl of Dysart; 1878–1935	Succeeded by Wenefryde Scott
Baronetage of Great Britain
Preceded by Lionel Tollemache	Baronet (of Hanby Hall); 1878–1935	Succeeded by Lyonel Tollemache
