= John Manners (English politician) =

English politician

An armorial hatchment with the coat of arms of John Manners (1730-1792), displaying his arms impaling the paternal arms of his wife, Louisa Tollemache, 7th Countess of Dysart, 1792.

John Manners (27 September 1730 – 23 September 1792) was an English politician, and the eldest natural son of Lord William Manners.

== Biography ==
In 1754, he replaced his father as Member of Parliament for Newark, which he represented until 1774.

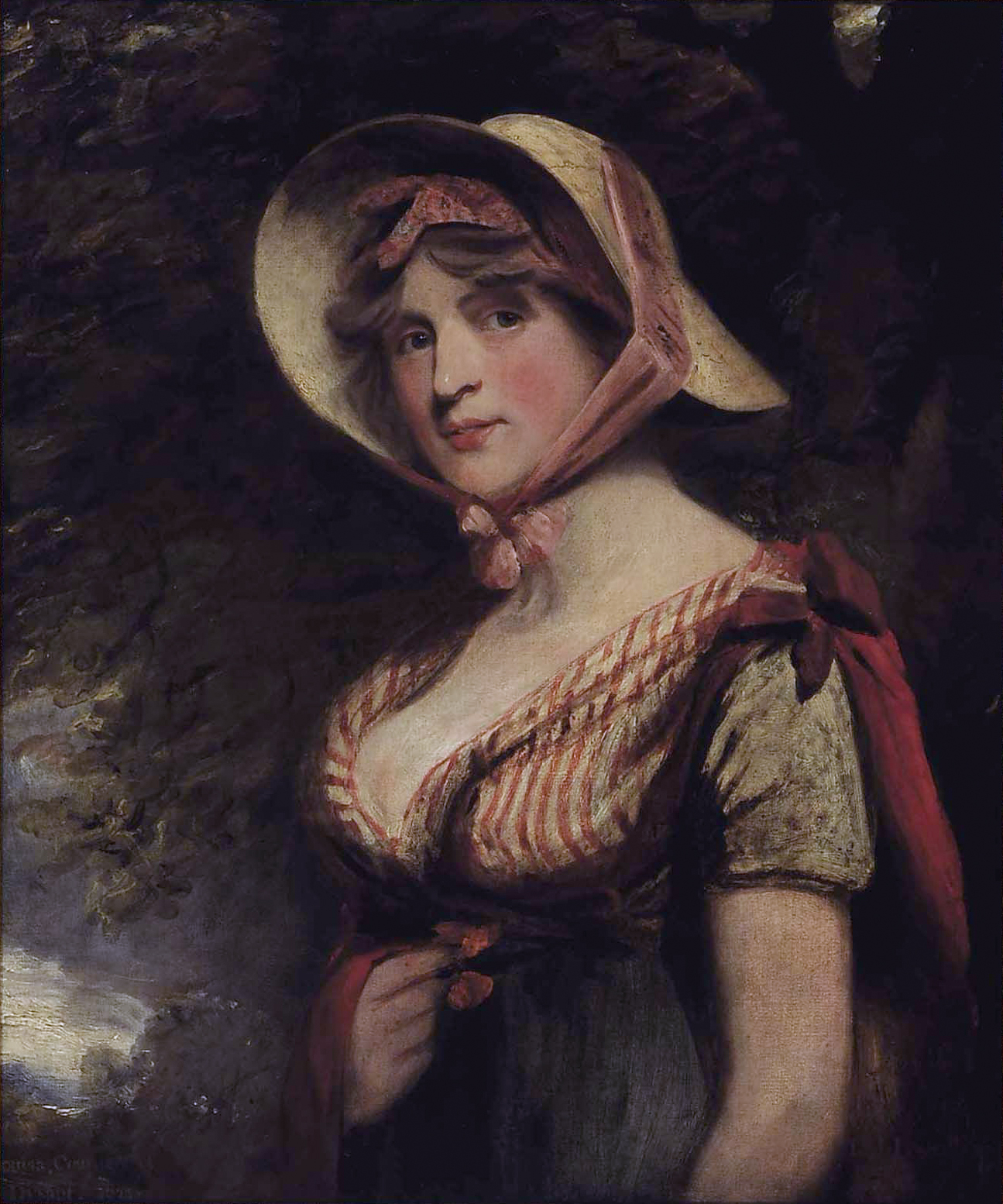
Louisa Manners. (1821)

He married Lady Louisa Tollemache on 4 September 1765, and they had ten children, several of whom adopted the surname of Talmash or Tollemache after it became clear that their mother would inherit the earldom of Dysart:

1. William Manners Talmash, Lord Huntingtower (1766–1833)
2. Hon. John Manners Tollemache (died 1837)
3. Hon. Charles Manners-Tollemache (2 January 1775 – 26 July 1850), married twice and had issue.
4. Lady Catherine Sophia Manners, or Katherine Sophia Manners (died 28 May 1825), married on 16 August 1793 as his first wife Sir Gilbert Heathcote, 4th Baronet
5. Maria Caroline Manners (died. 20 December 1805), married on 9 September 1799 James Duff, 4th Earl Fife
6. Louisa Grace Manners (died 19 February 1816), married on 15 August 1802 Aubrey Beauclerk, 6th Duke of St Albans
7. Lady Laura Manners Tollemache (died 11 July 1834), married on 2 June 1808 as Miss Laura Manners, John William Henry Dalrymple, later 7th Earl of Stair (1784–1840), nullified July 1811. For the subsequent history of the unfortunate Lady Laura, see "Life of Katherine Mansfield".
8. George Manners, died young
9. Elizabeth Louisa Manners, died young
10. Sophia Manners, died young

His wife inherited the Tollemache estates in 1820 at the age of 75. She died in 1840.

== Notes ==
Parliament of Great Britain
Preceded by Lord William Manners; Job Staunton Charlton	Member of Parliament for Newark; 1754–1774; With: Job Staunton Charlton 1754–1761; Thomas Thoroton 1761–1768; John Shelley 1768–1774	Succeeded by George Manners-Sutton; Henry Clinton
