= Hanby Hall =

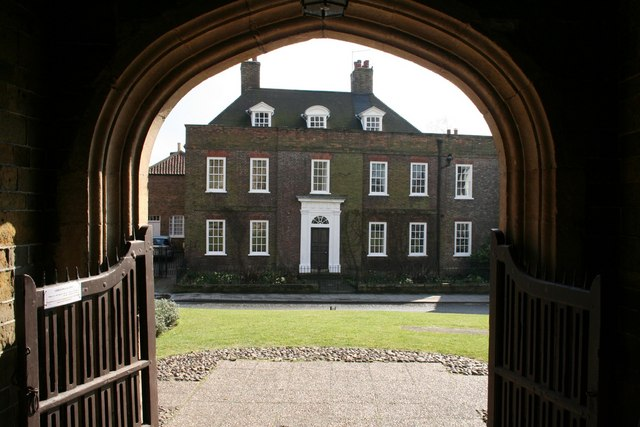

- Location within Lincolnshire

General information
- Status: Completed
- Type: House
- Location: 15 Church Street, Alford, Lincolnshire, England
- Coordinates: 53°16′2″N 0°11′7″W
- Completed: c. 1735

Height
- Roof: tile

Technical details
- Floor count: 2 plus attic

Design and construction
- Designations: Grade II*

Hanby Hall is a Grade II* listed early 18th-century building in Alford, Lincolnshire.

Hanby Hall was built by John Andrews. It is situated opposite St. Wilfrid's church, Alford. It is a red brick, Flemish bond, two-story house with attics. Originally five-bay and L-plan, it was extended to the right in the late 18th century. The building was Grade II* listed on 20 May 1953. It has no known association with Hanby Hall Farm.

The following description of Hanby Hall being partly destroyed in 1645 by Parliamentarian forces, often referred to as The Battle of Alford, was discounted as a work of fiction in Lincolnshire Notes & Queries, Volume 9, published in 1907, pages 162 and 163, and in Lincolnshire Past and Present, No 6 Winter 1992 and No 7 Spring 1992.

An earlier Hanby Hall existed in the village, partly destroyed in 1645 during the English Civil War by Parliamentarian forces led by the Earl of Manchester who captured and killed William Hamby, its Royalist owner.

The name Hanby Hall is also associated with Hanby Hall Farm, 4 miles (6.4 km) south of Alford, near to Welton le Marsh, (53.2048°N 0.2058°E). The present 18th-century farm house is possibly built on the site of a medieval hall and the location includes a medieval moated enclosure, fishponds, enclosures and boundaries seen as earthworks and thought to be the site of the Lost Village of Hanby Hall.
