= William Tollemache, Lord Huntingtower (1766–1833) =

British nobleman and Tory politician (1766-1833)

William Tollemache
- Lord Huntingtower

Baronet of Hanby Hall
- Reign: 1793–1833
- Successor: Lionel Tollemache, 8th Earl of Dysart
- Born: 19 May 1766
- Died: 11 March 1833 (aged 66)
- Noble family: Tollemache
- Spouse: Catherine Gray, Lady Manners (m. 1790)
- Issue: Hon. Louisa Tollemache; Lady Catherine Camilla Tollemache; Lady Emily Frances Tollemache; Lionel Tollemache, 8th Earl of Dysart; Felix Tollemache; Hon. Arthur Caesar Tollemache; Hon. Caroline Tollemache; Lady Catherine Octavia Tollemache; Hugh Tollemache; Frederick Tollemache; Algernon Tollemache; Lady Laura Maria Tollemache
- Father: John Manners
- Mother: Louisa Tollemache, 7th Countess of Dysart

William Manners Tollemache, Lord Huntingtower (19 May 1766 – 11 March 1833), known as Sir William Manners, Bt, between 1793 and 1821, was a British nobleman and Tory politician.

== Background ==
Born William Manners, he was the eldest son of John Manners and Louisa Tollemache, 7th Countess of Dysart. On 12 January 1793, at the age of 26, he was created a Baronet, of Hanby Hall in the County of Lincoln. On his mother's succession to the earldom in 1821, he was styled Lord Huntingtower, and adopted the surname of Talmash or Tollemache.

== Political career ==
Huntingtower was known for his high-handed manipulation of the Parliamentary vote in Ilchester in Somerset. He owned most of the borough, and represented it from 1803 to 1804 and 1806–1807. In 1818 his candidates, one of whom was his son, were not elected, and he had the workhouse pulled down. A petition to Parliament stated:

163 men, women, and children, from one month to upwards of 80 years, were all turned out into the street, without knowing of a place of shelter themselves at the most inclement season of the year. Some of them were able to get together some straw in the town-hall. Some of them betook themselves to the fields. Among the people so turned out, there were several pregnant women, and one daily expected the pangs of child birth.

Parliament offered no amelioration. In the severe winter of 1828–1829, he engaged in a large public relief project, hiring 528 workers in the vicinity of his estates in Buckminster in Leicestershire.

He served as High Sheriff of Leicestershire in 1809.

== Family ==
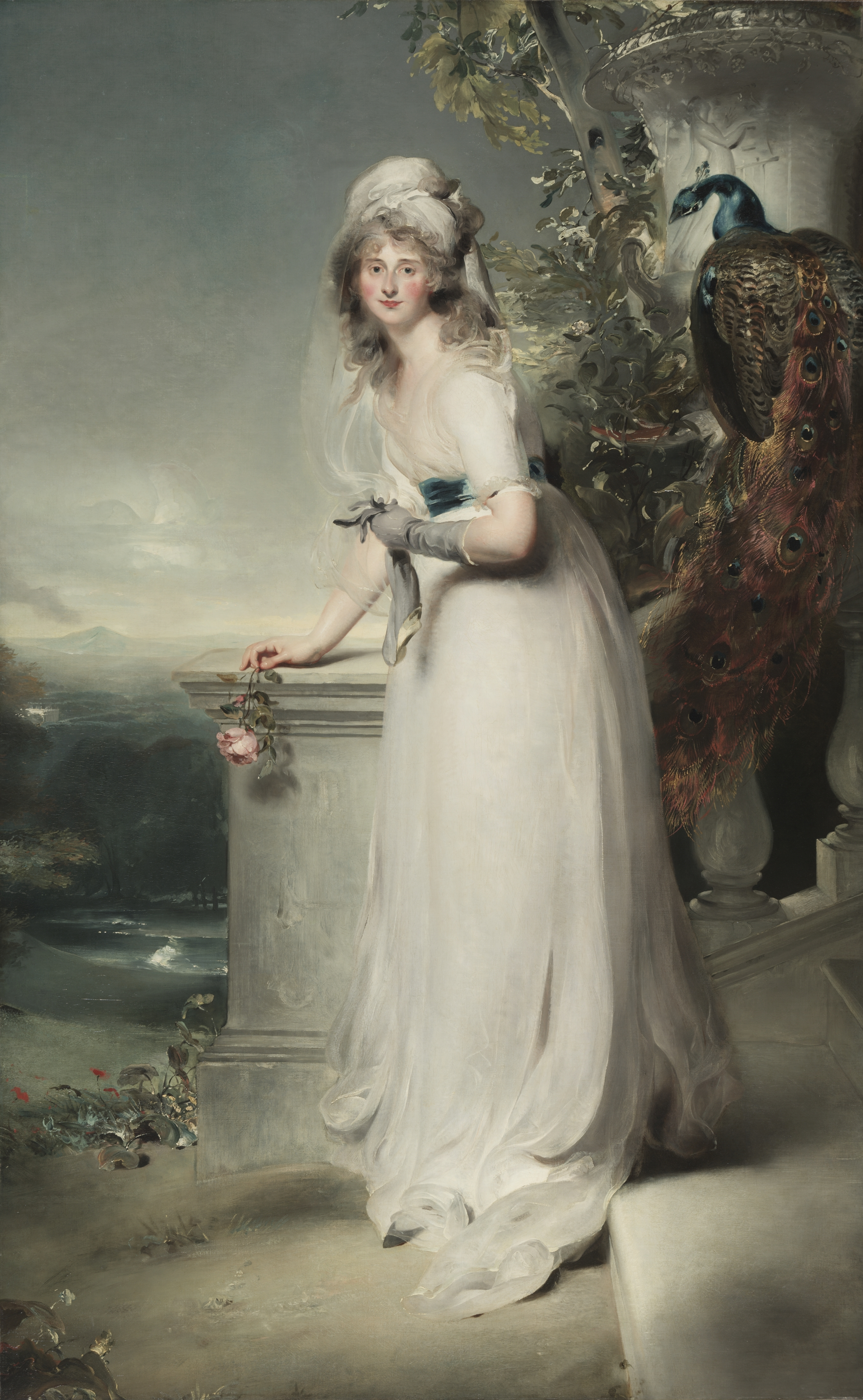
Portrait of Lady Manners by Thomas Lawrence, 1794. Cleveland Museum of Art, Ohio.

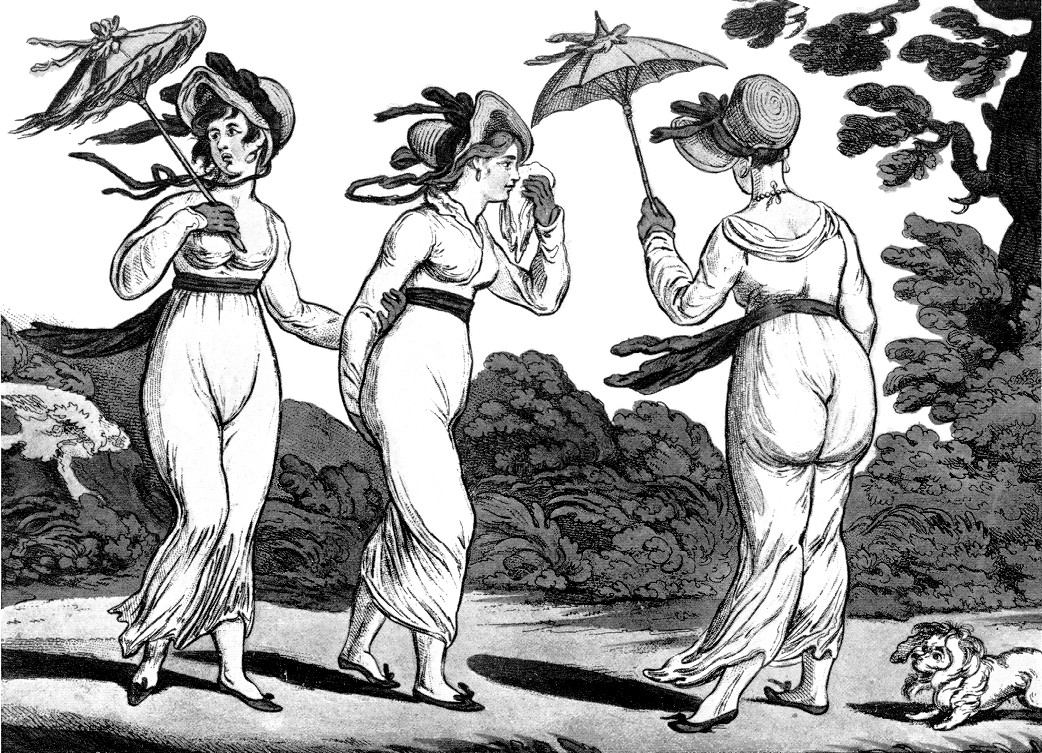
The Graces in a High Wind by James Gillray, believed to be Louisa, Emily and Catherine Manners

On 12 January 1790, he married Catherine Rebecca Gray (d. 1852), by whom he had six sons and six daughters:

- Hon. Louisa Tollemache (1791–1830), married Sir Joseph Burke, 11th Baronet and had issue
- Lady Catherine Camilla Tollemache (1792–1863), married Sir George Sinclair, 2nd Baronet and had issue
- Lady Emily Frances Tollemache (1793–1864), unmarried
- Hon. Lionel Tollemache, 8th Earl of Dysart (1794–1878)
- Hon. Felix Thomas Tollemache (1796–1843), married twice and had issue
- Hon. Arthur Caesar Tollemache (1797–1848), married and had issue
- Hon. Caroline Tollemache (1799–1825), unmarried
- Lady Catherine Octavia Tollemache (1800–1878)
- Hon. Hugh Francis Tollemache (1802–1890), married and had issue
- Hon. Frederick James Tollemache (1804–1888), married twice and had issue
- Hon. Algernon Gray Tollemache (1805–1892), married
- Lady Laura Maria Tollemache (1807–1888), married James Grattan

Lionel's surviving siblings were granted precedence as the children of an earl on 6 November 1840.

He suffered a stroke at Buckminster Park on 7 March 1833 and died on the 11th.

== See also ==
- Public houses and inns in Grantham

Parliament of the United Kingdom
| Preceded by William Hunter; Thomas Plummer | Member of Parliament for Ilchester; 1803–1804; With: Charles Brooke | Succeeded by Charles Brooke; John Manners |
| Preceded by Charles Brooke; John Manners | Member of Parliament for Ilchester; 1806–1807; With: Nathaniel Saxon | Succeeded by Richard Brinsley Sheridan; Michael Angelo Taylor |
Honorary titles
| Preceded by John Finch Simpson | High Sheriff of Leicestershire; 1809–1810 | Succeeded by Thomas Bowes |
Baronetage of Great Britain
| New creation | Baronet (of Hanby Hall); 1793–1833 | Succeeded by Lionel Tollemache |
