= Lionel Tollemache, 8th Earl of Dysart =

British peer and Tory politician

The Right Honourable The Earl of Dysart
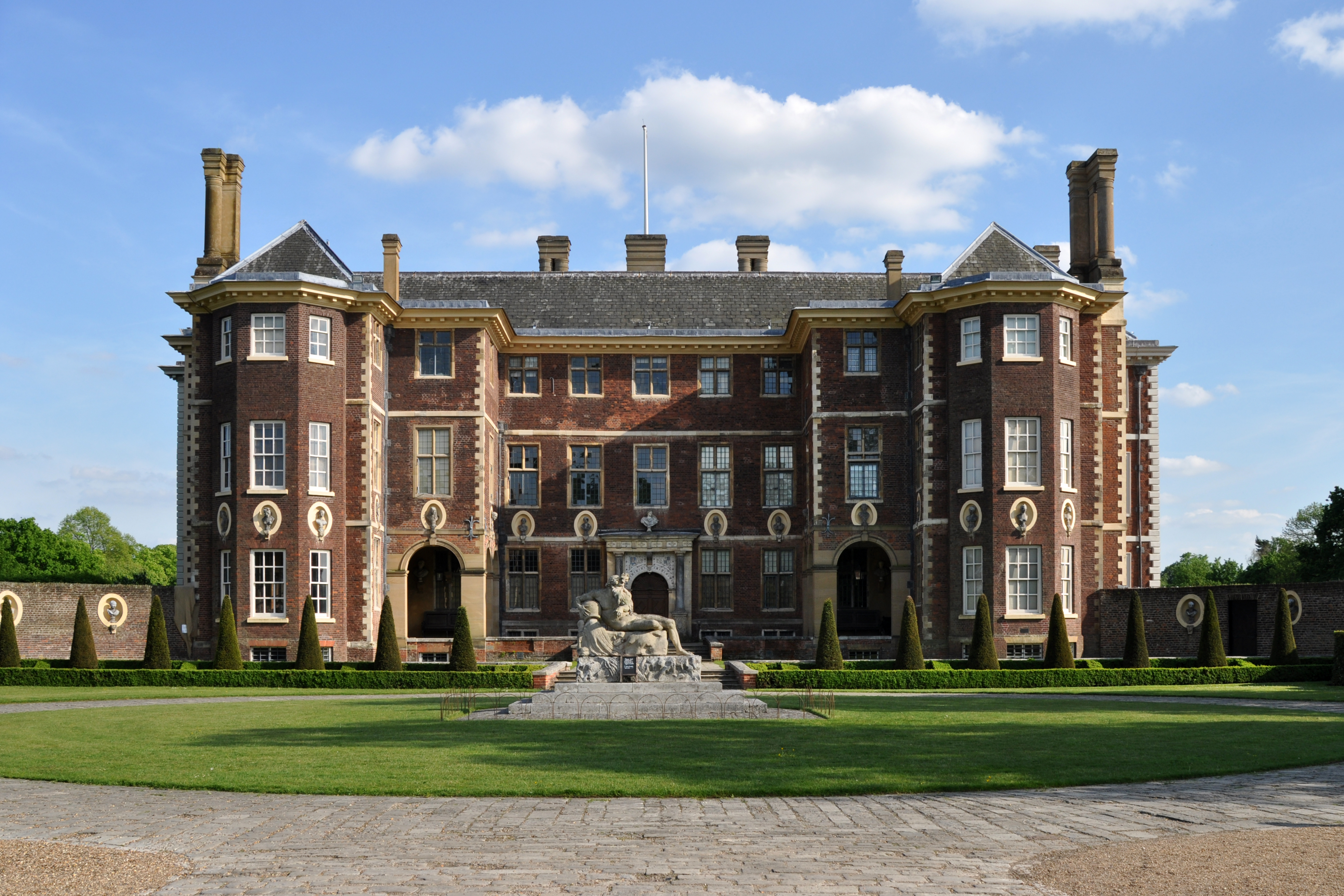
- Born: 18 November 1794
- Died: 23 September 1878 (aged 83); Ham House, London
- Spouse: Maria Elizabeth Toone (m. 1819; died 1869)
- Children: William Tollemache, Lord Huntingtower
- Parents: William Tollemache, Lord Huntingtower (father); Catherine Gray, Lady Manners (mother)

Lionel William John Tollemache, 8th Earl of Dysart (18 November 1794 – 23 September 1878), known as Lionel Manners until 1821, as Lionel Tollemache between 1821 and 1833, and styled Lord Huntingtower between 1833 and 1840, was a British peer and Tory politician.

== Background ==
Dysart was the son of William Manners (later William Tollemache, Lord Huntingtower) and poet Catherine Rebecca Gray, daughter of Francis Gray. In 1821, when his grandmother Louisa Tollemache became 7th Countess of Dysart, he assumed by Royal licence the surname of Tollemache in lieu of Manners. Upon his father's death in 1833, he succeeded as second Baronet of Hanby Hall and as heir apparent to his grandmother, with the courtesy title of Lord Huntingtower.

== Political career ==
Dysart sat as Member of Parliament for Ilchester, alongside his younger brother the Hon. Felix Tollemache, from 1827 until they were defeated at the 1830 general election. In 1836 he was appointed High Sheriff of Leicestershire. In 1841 he succeeded his grandmother in the earldom of Dysart and to her estate at Ham House in Surrey. However, as this was a Scottish peerage it did not entitle him to a seat in the House of Lords.

== Family ==
Lord Dysart married Maria Elizabeth, daughter of Sweeny Toone, in 1819. In 1820 she bore one son, William Lionel Felix Tollemache. She died on 15 February 1869. Lord Dysart died on 23 September 1878, aged 83, and was succeeded in the earldom by his grandson, William John Manners Tollemache, 9th Earl of Dysart, his son William, styled 'Lord Huntingtower', having predeceased him.

With Esther Cox, Lord Dysart had a natural son Alfred Cox (born 28 March 1818), who changed his name to Alfred Manners in 1850.

Parliament of the United Kingdom
| Preceded by Richard Sharp; John Williams | Member of Parliament for Ilchester; 1827 – 1830; With: Hon. Felix Tollemache | Succeeded by Michael Bruce; James Joseph Hope-Vere |
Baronetage of Great Britain
| Preceded by William Tollemache | Baronet (of Hanby Hall); 1833–1878 | Succeeded by William John Manners Tollemache |
Peerage of Scotland
| Preceded by Louisa Tollemache | Earl of Dysart; 1840–1878 | Succeeded by William John Manners Tollemache |
