= The Rape of the Sabine Women (Poussin) =

Series of paintings by Nicolas Poussin

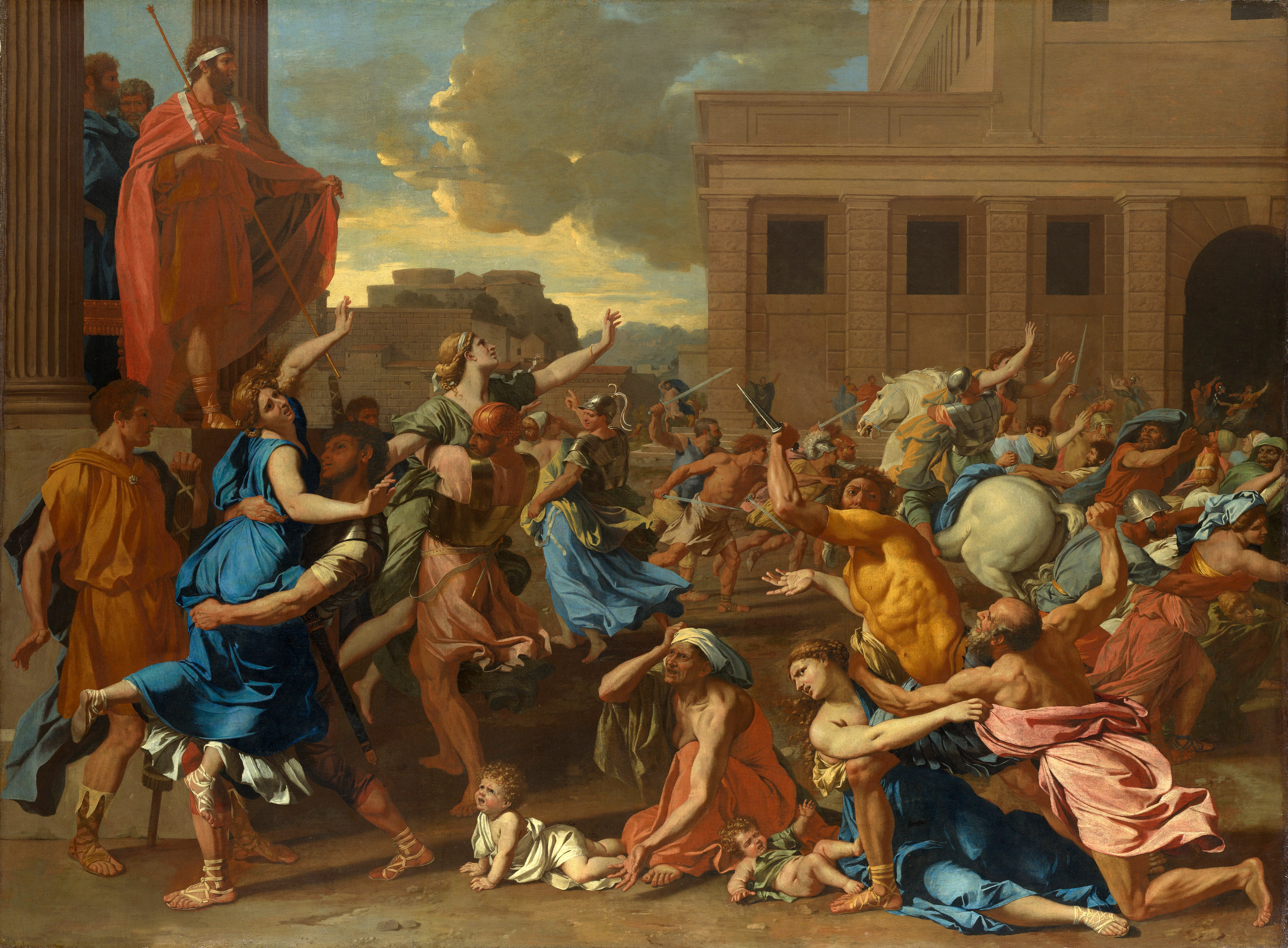
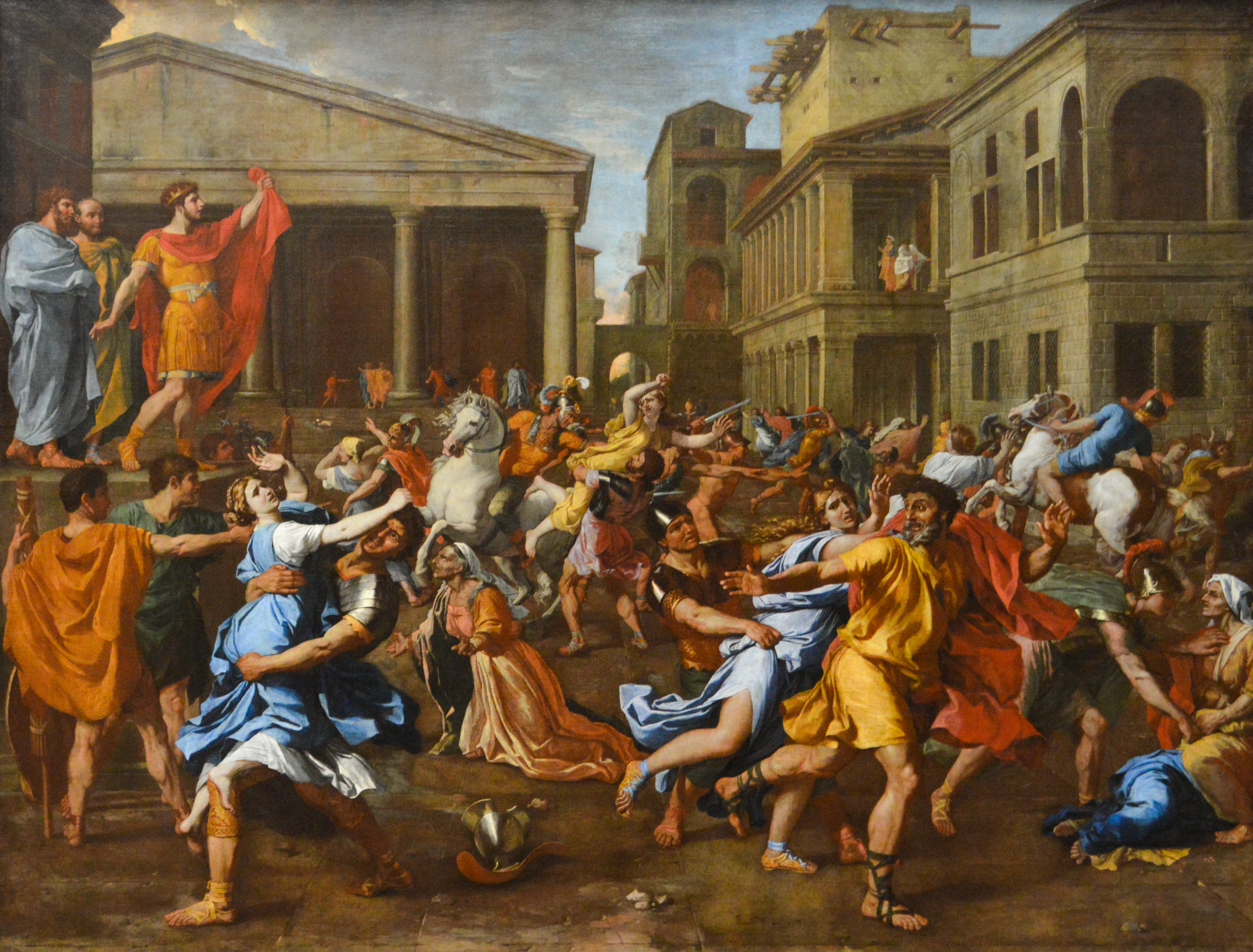
First version (above), second version (below)

The rape of the Sabine women is the subject of two oil paintings by Nicolas Poussin. (Note: The story is treated by Livy (1.9), Plutarch (Rom. 14), and Virgil (Aen. 8.1), among others. Romulus, his people having been refused the right of connubium or legal marriage by the Sabines and the Latins, instituted games in honour of the god Consus and invited his neighbours with their wives and children to the festival. When they were assembled, the Roman youths seized and carried off the virgins and made them their wives. This led to war, and both parties were nearly exhausted with the struggle when the Sabine women rushed in among the combatants and brought about a reconciliation between their husbands and their fathers. Poussin follows Plutarch most closely.) The first version was painted in Rome about 1634 or 1635 and is now in the Metropolitan Museum of Art in New York City, catalogued as The Abduction of the Sabine Women. The second, painted in 1637 or 1638, is in the Louvre in Paris, catalogued as L'enlèvement des Sabines. (Note: However, Costello (1947), Blunt (1966) and Friedlaender (1966) have thought the Louvre picture anterior to the Metropolitan picture.)

== Influences ==
The theme of kidnapping was very successful in Renaissance and Baroque art. Among the legendary episodes relating rapes, kidnappings or abductions may be mentioned those of Helen by Paris, of Europa by Zeus, of Deianeira by the centaur Nessus, and of Proserpina by Pluto; the latter was sculpted by Bernini (1621–1622).

Beginning in the quattrocento, scenes of the abduction and reconciliation of the Sabine women were often figured on Tuscan cassoni (wedding chests), probably as domestic instruction for brides. Shortly after Poussin arrived in Rome in 1624, Pietro da Cortona painted a celebrated picture of the abduction (c. 1630), which was possibly influenced by such cassoni, and which in turn influenced Poussin.

For the two pairs of entwined abductors and captives depicted in the foreground of both versions, Poussin was probably indebted to Giambologna's Mannerist sculpture of the same subject (1579–1583), which was reproduced, with the figures reversed, as a chiaroscuro woodcut by Andrea Andreani (1584), and from which Poussin produced several pen-and-bistre drawings of the motif of a man lifting a woman.

Poussin was also deeply influenced by the classical antiquities which he had the opportunity to study whilst in Rome. The group to the right of the Metropolitan picture recalls The Galatian Suicide, (Note: The Galatian Suicide also probably influenced Poussin's earlier work, The Massacre of the Innocents (c. 1628).) a 2nd century AD Roman marble after a lost Greek original, which had been recently unearthed during excavations for the redevelopment of the Villa Ludovisi, and was engraved by François Perrier. (Note: Published in Perrier's Segmenta nobilium signorum et statuarii quæ æternæ ruinis erepta… (Rome, 1638).)

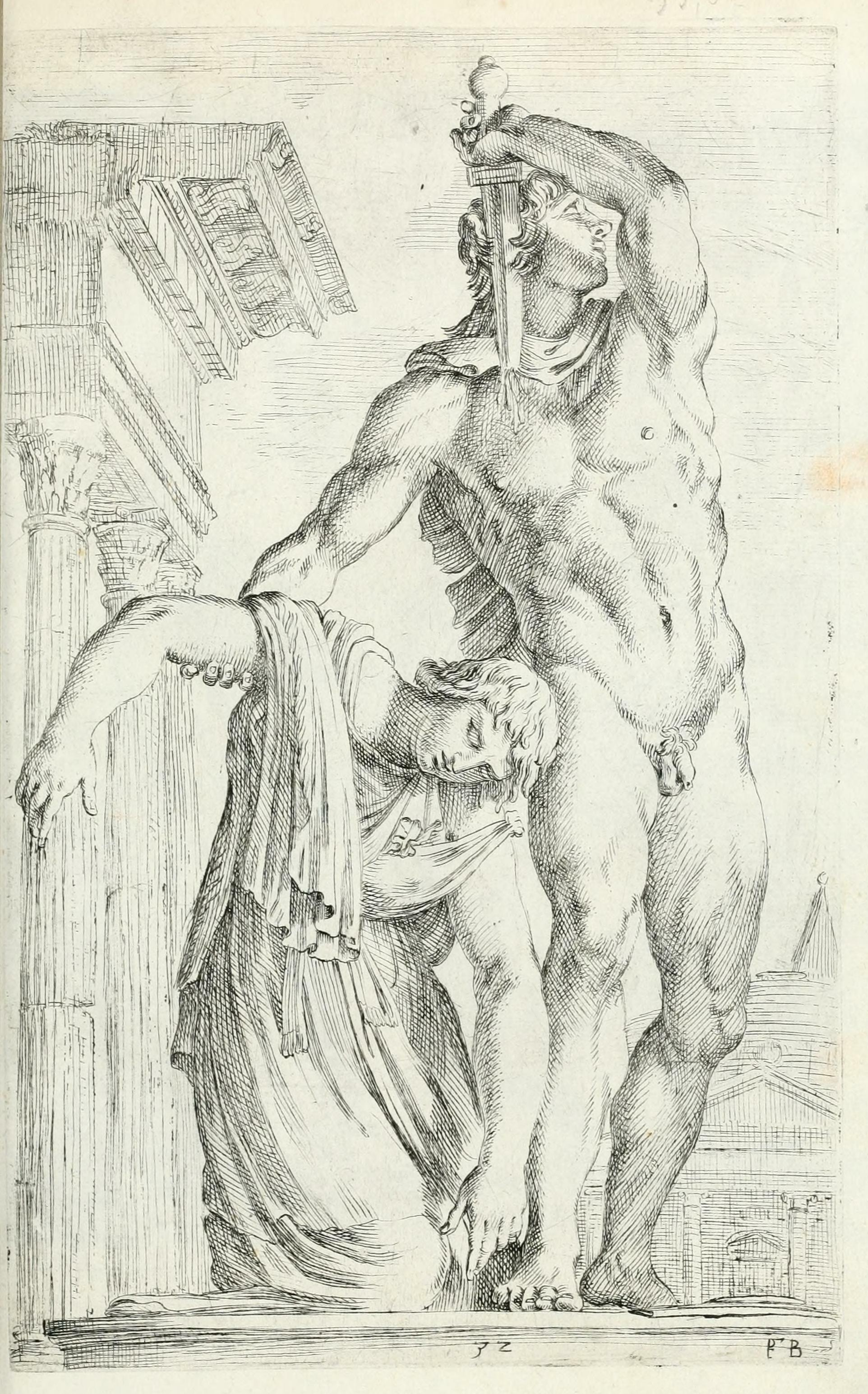
F. Perrier after an antique marble, 1638

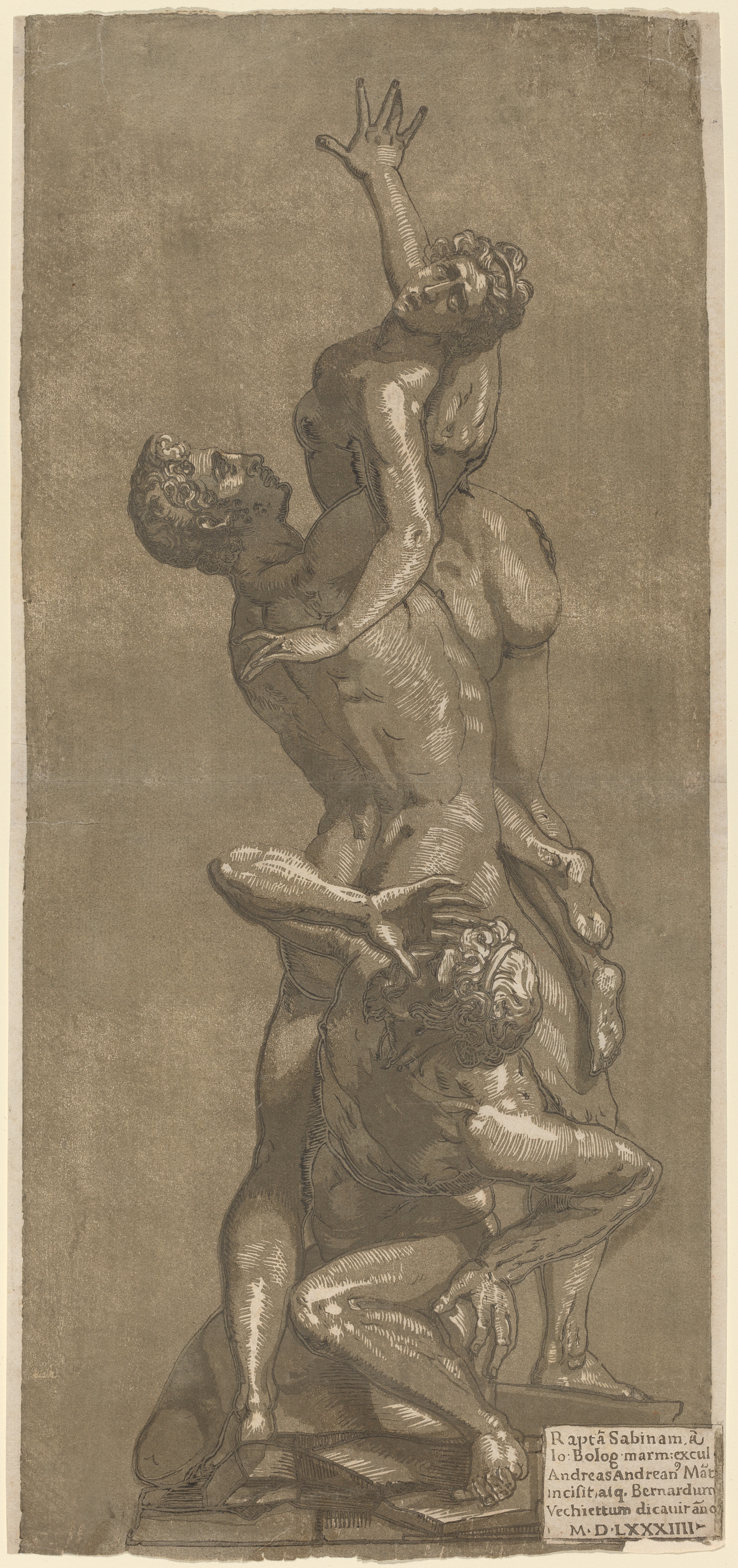
A. Andreani after Giambologna, 1584

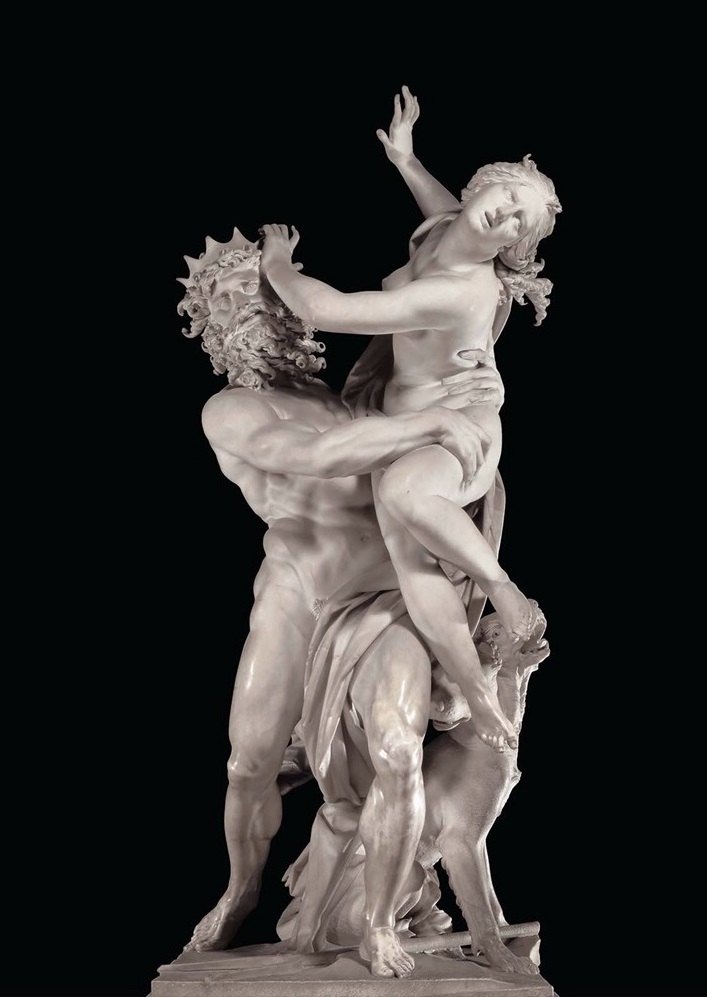
Bernini, The Rape of Proserpina, 1621–1622

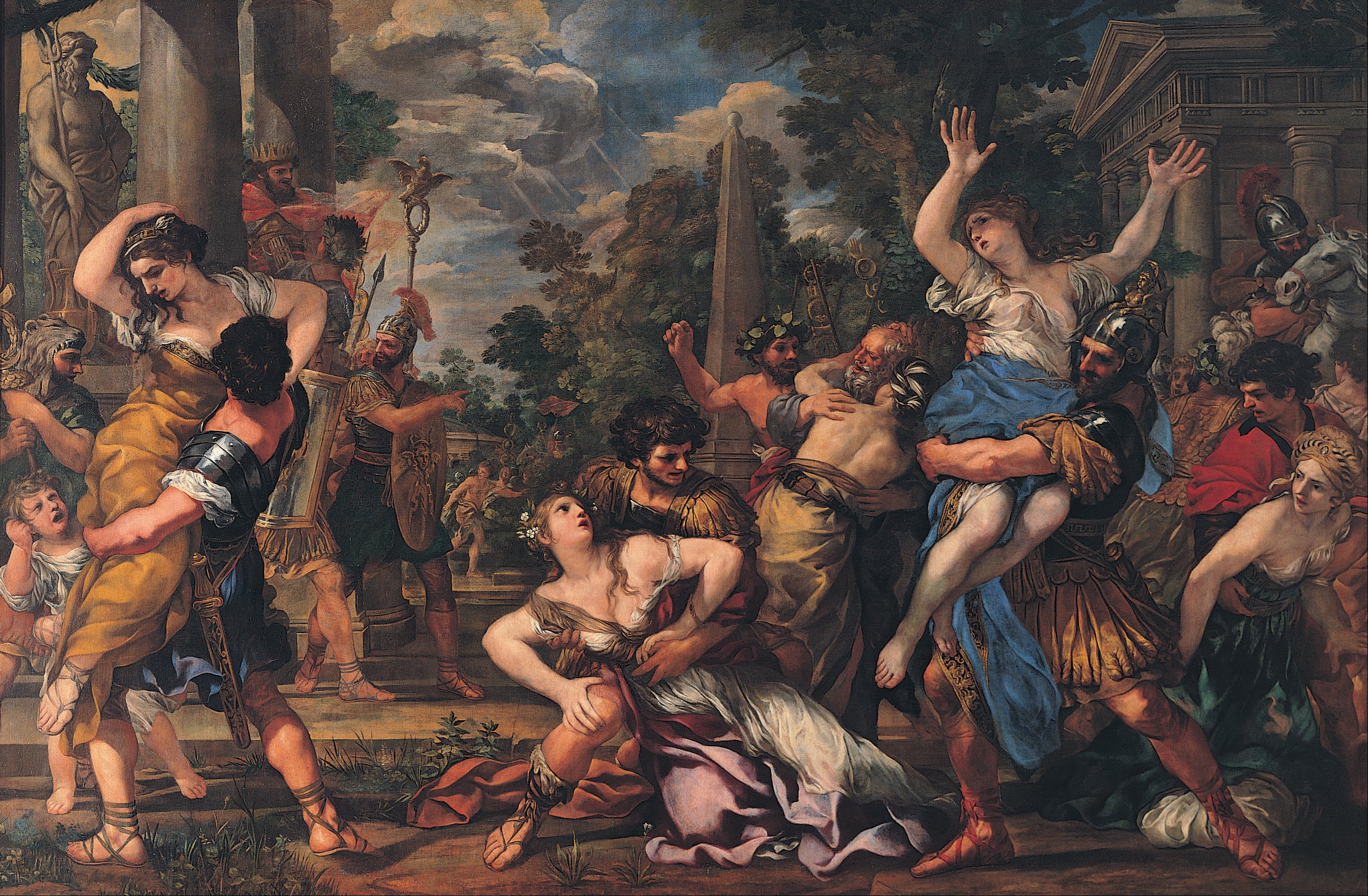
P. da Cortona, The Rape of the Sabines, c. 1630

== Metropolitan version ==
=== Description ===
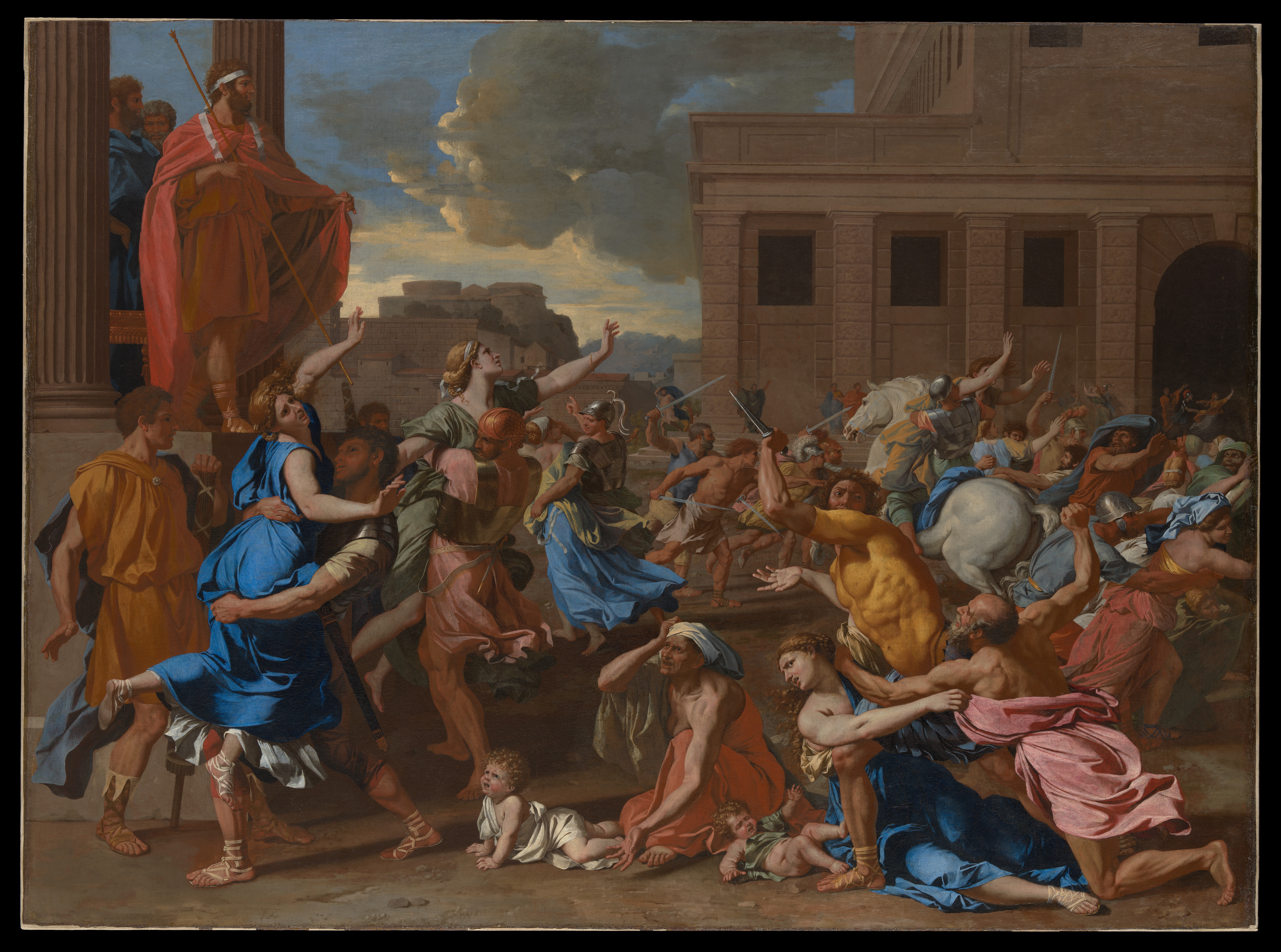
The first version, oil on canvas, 154.6 x 209.9 cm (Metropolitan Museum of Art)

This bold political occurrence is exhibited as passing in the forum of the newly erected city of Rome. Romulus, its founder and king, stands on an elevation at the left side between two columns, holding a royal wand in one hand and raising the skirt of his robe with the other; the latter motion being the signal for every Roman to seize a Sabine wife. The games in honour of the god Consus have ceased, and a scene of uproar and confusion has succeeded. Amidst the numerous groups of struggling women and resisting fathers is one close to the front (viewer's right) composed of a fine athletic man standing across a prostrate woman in the act of striking her aged parent who has seized him round the loins; (Note: In the right of the foreground, the Roman warrior's violently twisted pose and defined musculature are emphasised by his form-fitting lorica—perhaps anachronistic in its golden colouring, but balancing with the blue of the Sabines' rumpled garments. He brandishes an upraised blade, resembling a rondel dagger or stiletto.) near these are an aged woman sitting on the ground bewailing the loss of her child, and two infants, one of whom lies on its back, crying. On the opposite (left) side are two sturdy Romans, each bearing in his arms a fine woman; a lictor, with the fasces in his hand, stands near them, viewing the contest. (Note: The treatment of the basilica (right of the background) was probably informed by Vitruvius.)

Smith (1837) comments, "This capital production is painted in the most esteemed manner of the master and has the advantage of being clear in its tones of colouring and in excellent preservation."

=== Provenance ===
Painted probably in 1633 or 1634. Belonged to the Maréchal Charles de Créquy, who was French ambassador to Rome in the 1630s; and then to King Louis XIII's chief minister, Cardinal Richelieu, who probably bequeathed it to his niece, the Duchess d'Aiguillon. Purchased at the sale of the Stourhead heirlooms of the Hoare baronets of Barn Elms, on 2 June 1883 (No. 63). Acquired by Sir Francis Cook, 1st Baronet (d. 1901) in 1883 and displayed by himself and his heirs at Doughty House, Richmond; inherited by his son Sir Frederick (d. 1920); by his son Sir Herbert (d. 1939); and his son Sir Francis Cook, 4th Baronet, from whom it was purchased by Pinakos, Inc. (Rudolf J. Heinemann), and Knoedler, of New York, in 1946.

Engraved by Jean or Gérard Audran.

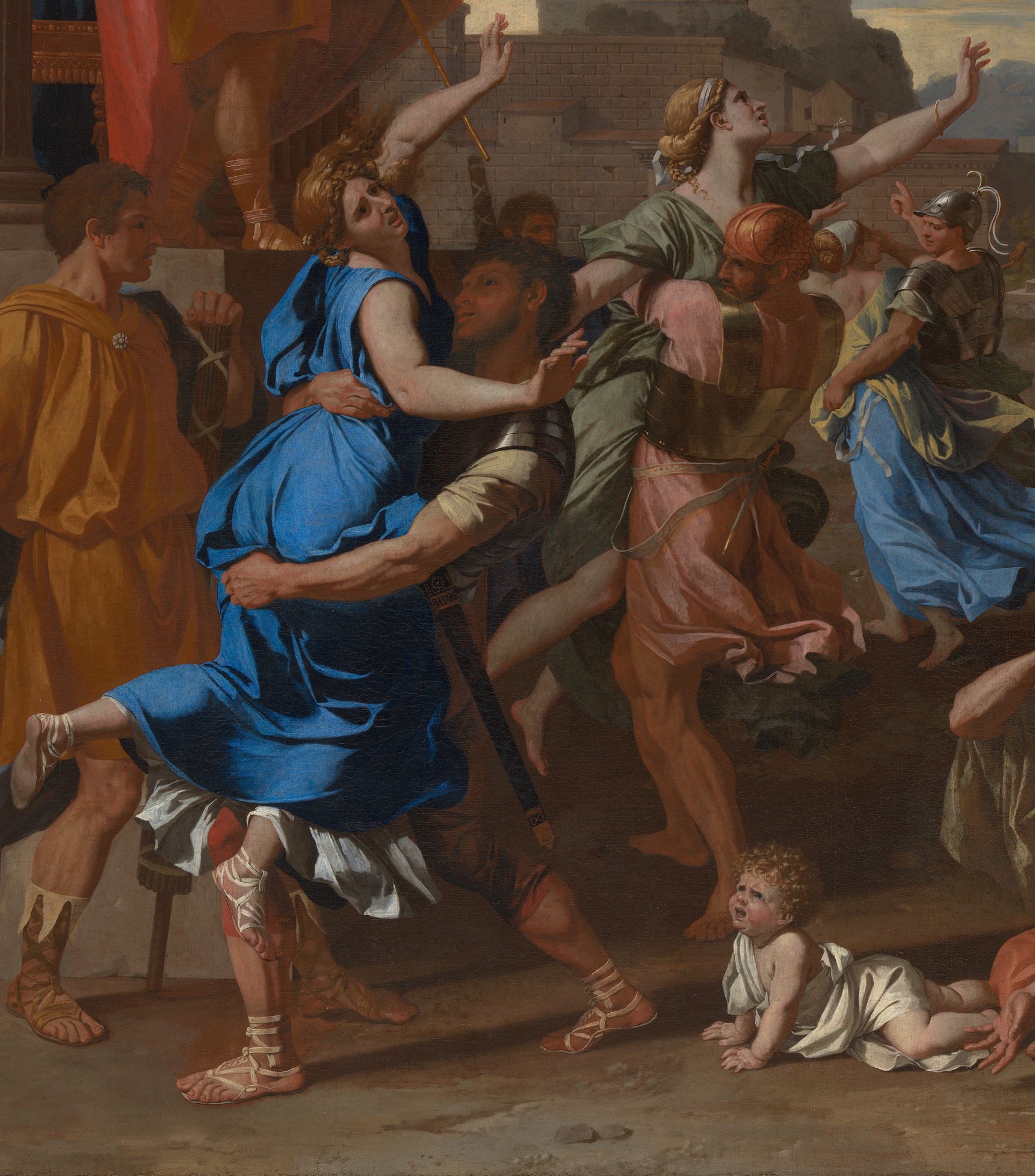

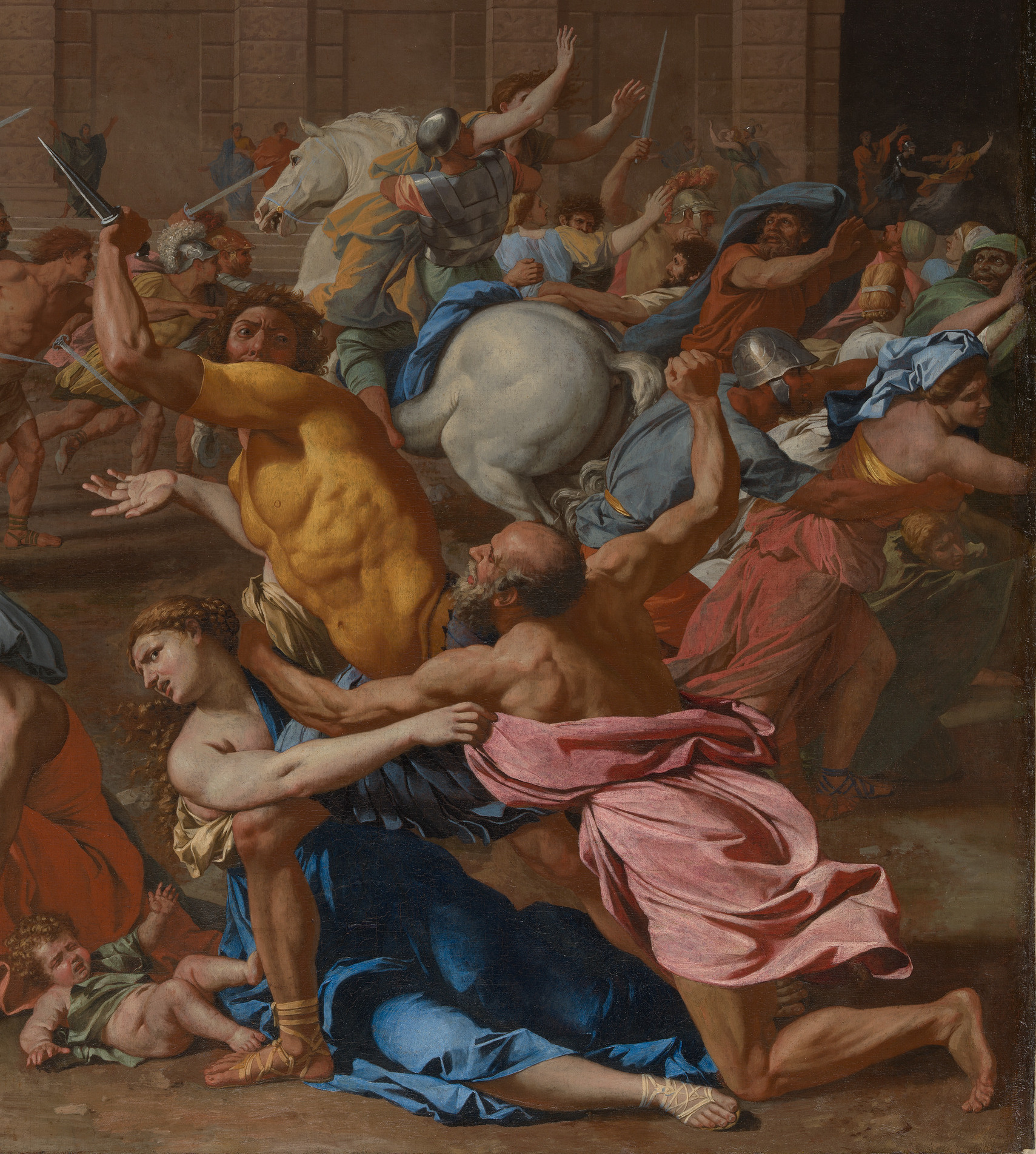

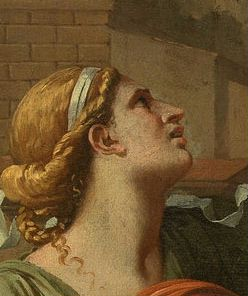

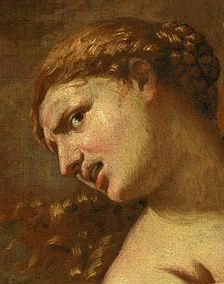

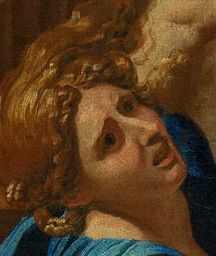

== Louvre version ==
=== Description ===
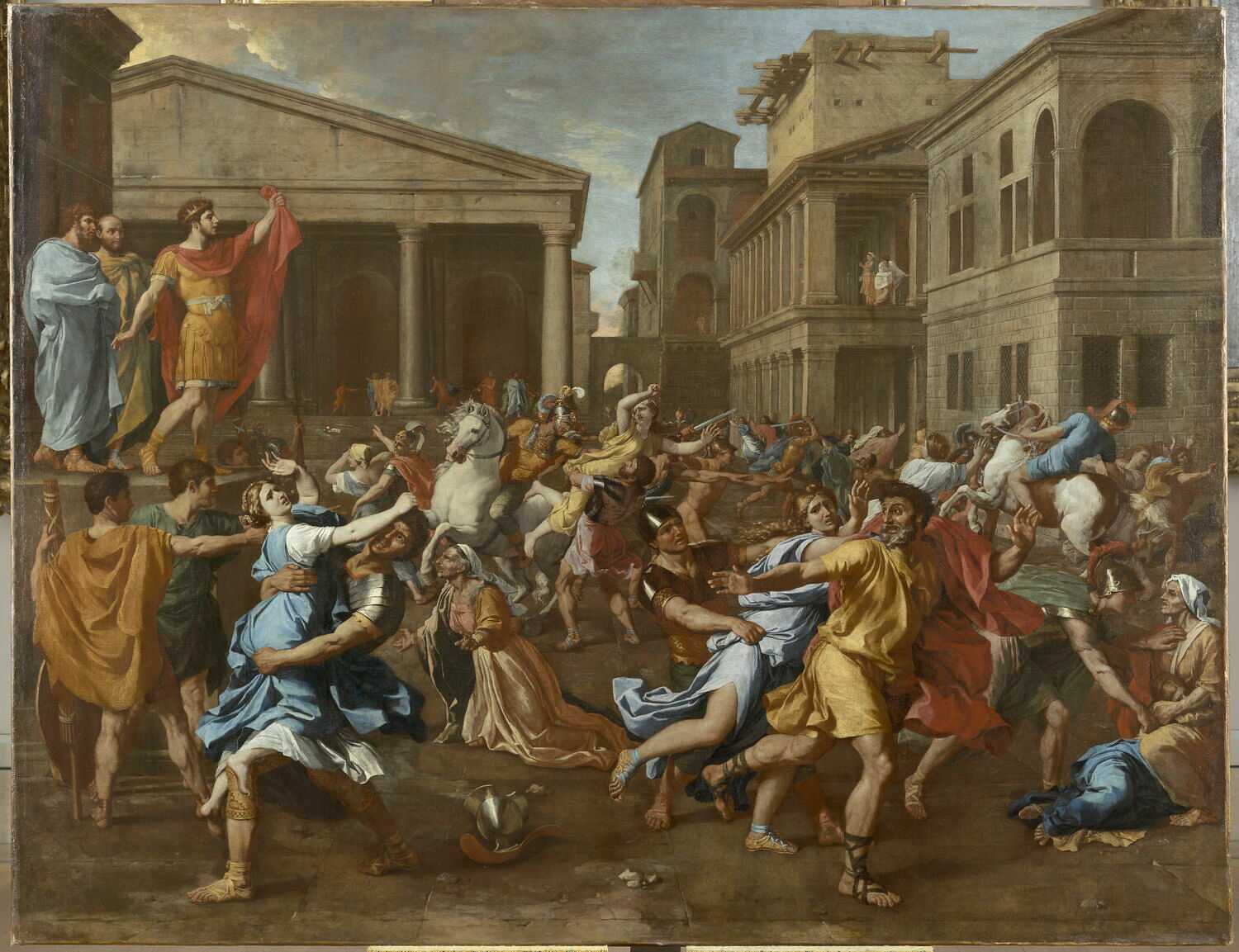
The second version, oil on canvas, 159 x 206 cm (Musée du Louvre)

The composition of this picture differs in many ways from the preceding. The place exhibits a large open square surrounded by beautiful edifices; (Note: That the city was newly founded is shown by the tower still under construction.) in front of one of them, and on an elevation at the left side, (Note: Described by Champlin (1887) as the peristyle of a palace.) stands Romulus with two senators behind him. He is dressed in military attire and in the act of raising the skirt of his robe, at which preconcerted signal every soldier has seized a Sabine woman, and a scene of confusion and strife has succeeded the festive games. Among the numerous groups may be noticed on the left in front, a soldier bearing off a struggling female, who has knocked his helmet from his head and is pulling his hair; a little retired from these are two lictors (far left), before whom an aged woman is kneeling and supplicating their aid. On the opposite (right) side is a Roman seizing a young woman, who is running after her father, and the latter, while endeavouring to escape, looks round at her ravisher. Further towards the right side is a group composed of an aged woman sitting on the ground sheltering between her knees a young girl whom a youth by entreaty, seconded by a little force, is endeavouring to obtain. (Note: This younger Roman wears the crested helmet of a Praetorian guardsman.) In the more distant groups are seen soldiers on horseback and others on foot either forcibly bearing off the Sabine women or combating with their protectors.

=== Provenance ===
Painted in Rome about 1637 or 1638; according to the artist's friend and biographer Bellori, for Cardinal Alessandro Luigi Omodei (for whom Poussin also painted The Triumph of Flora, and the picture known as Women Bathing, now lost); whence passed to the collection of Louis XIV in 1685. Engraved by Abraham Girardet; Étienne Baudet; P. L. H. Laurent; Matthijs Pool; Edme Bovinet.

A picture of the same subject, differently treated, was formerly in the collection of Sir Richard Colt Hoare (d. 1838), and has sometimes been conflated with the version now in New York.

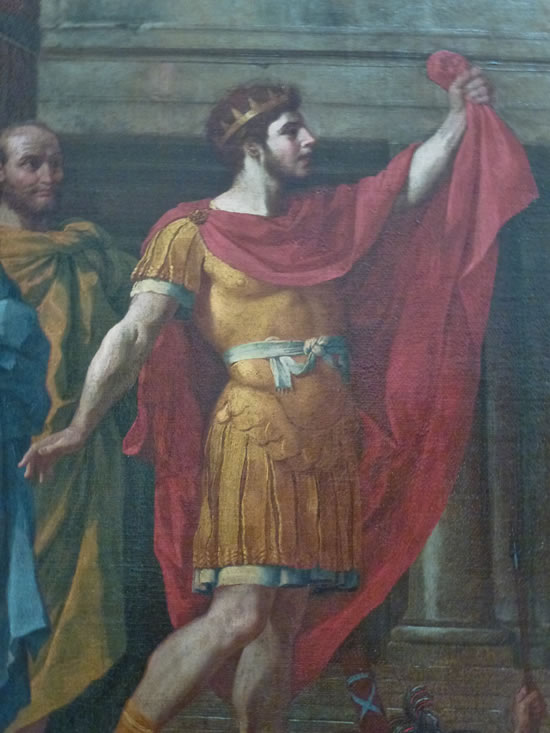

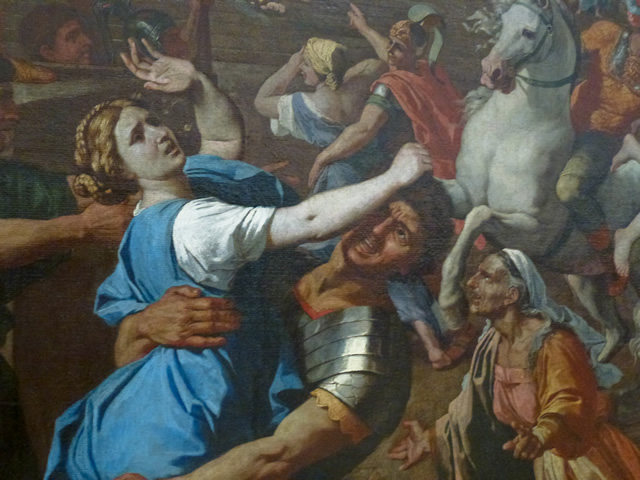

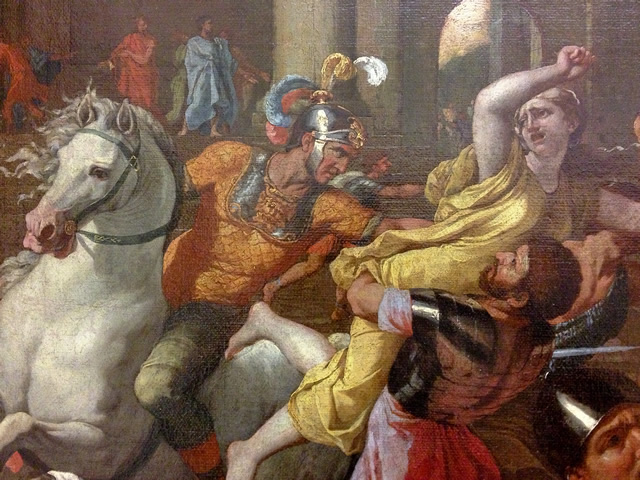

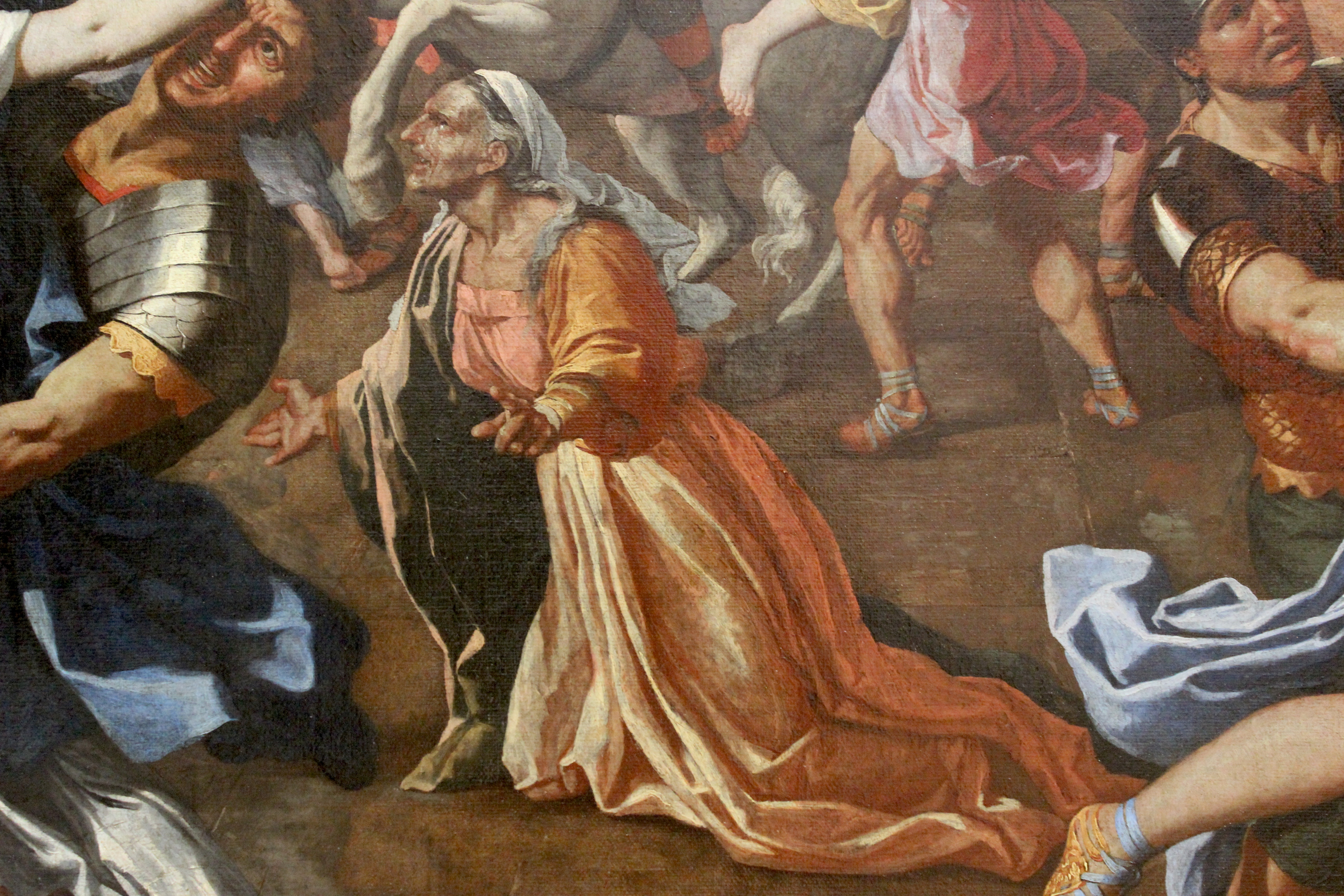

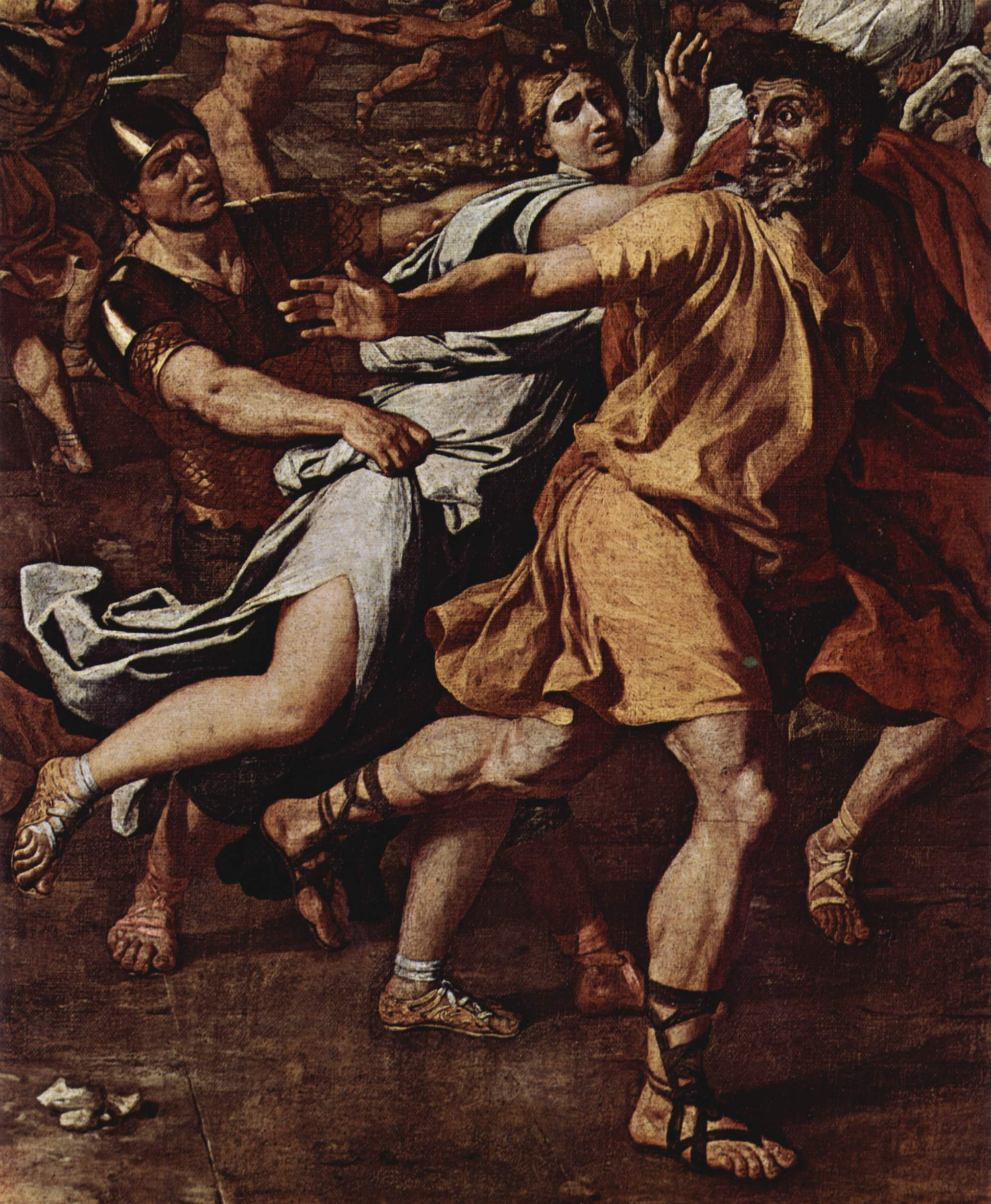

== Drawings ==
There are four preparatory drawings for the two pictures: three sketches for the Louvre version, now at Chatsworth House, the Uffizi, and Windsor Castle; and a fourth, for the Metropolitan version, at Windsor Castle.

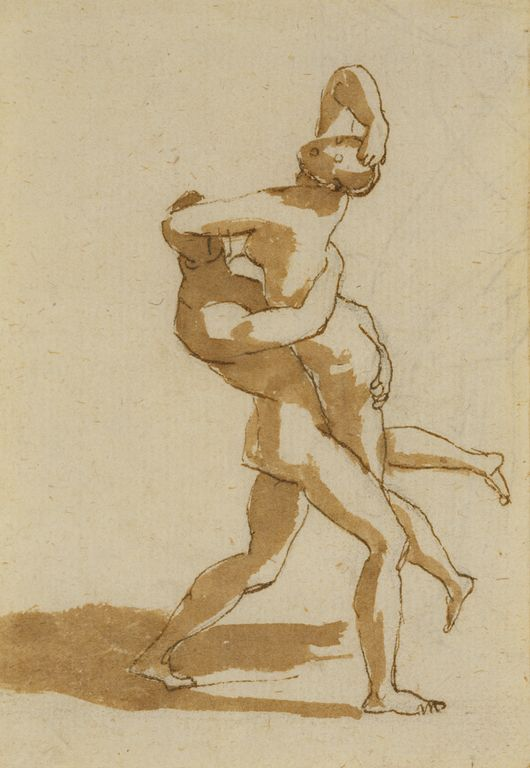
Study for the Rape of the Sabine Women, c. 1633 (Chatsworth)

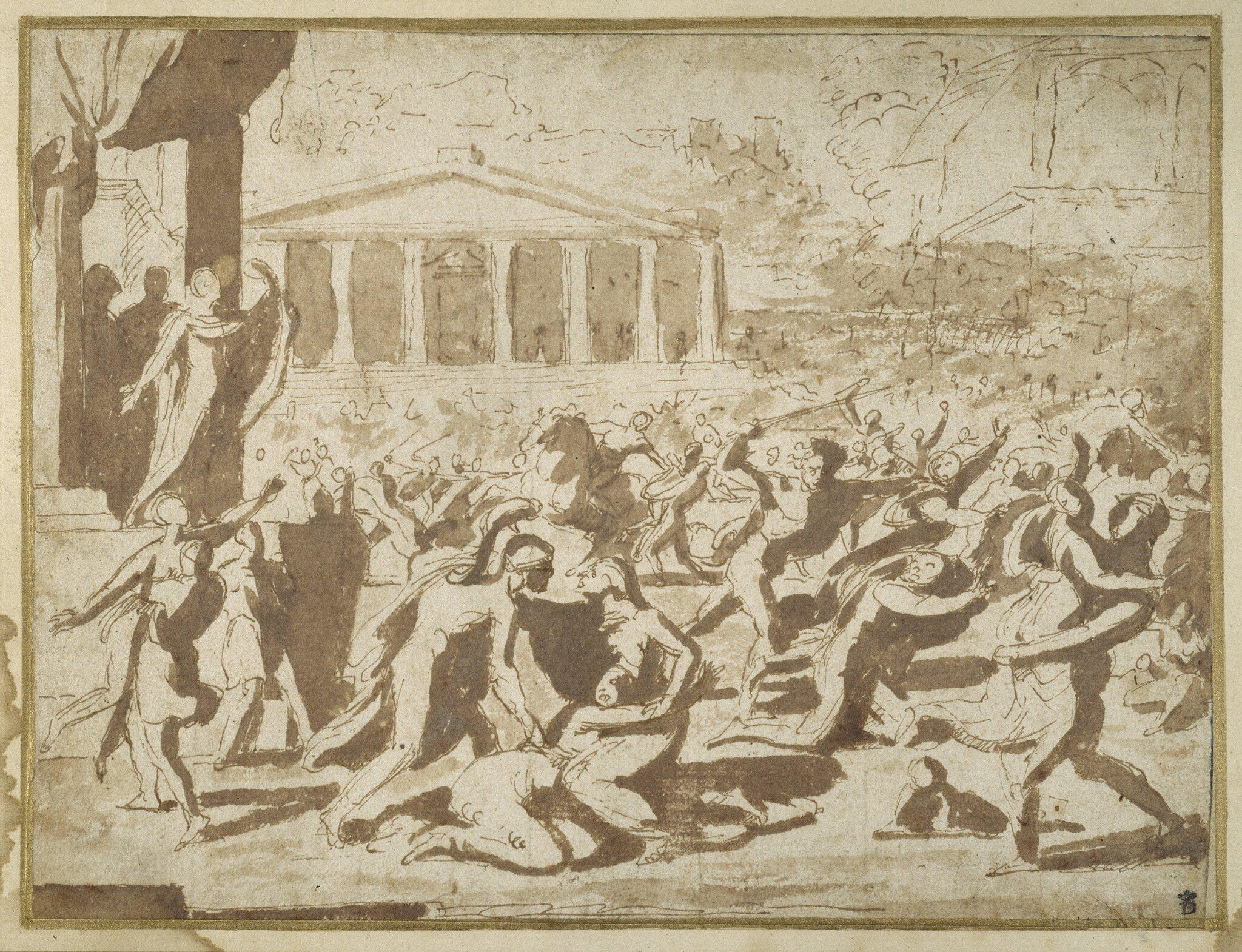
The Rape of the Sabines, c. 1633 (Chatsworth)

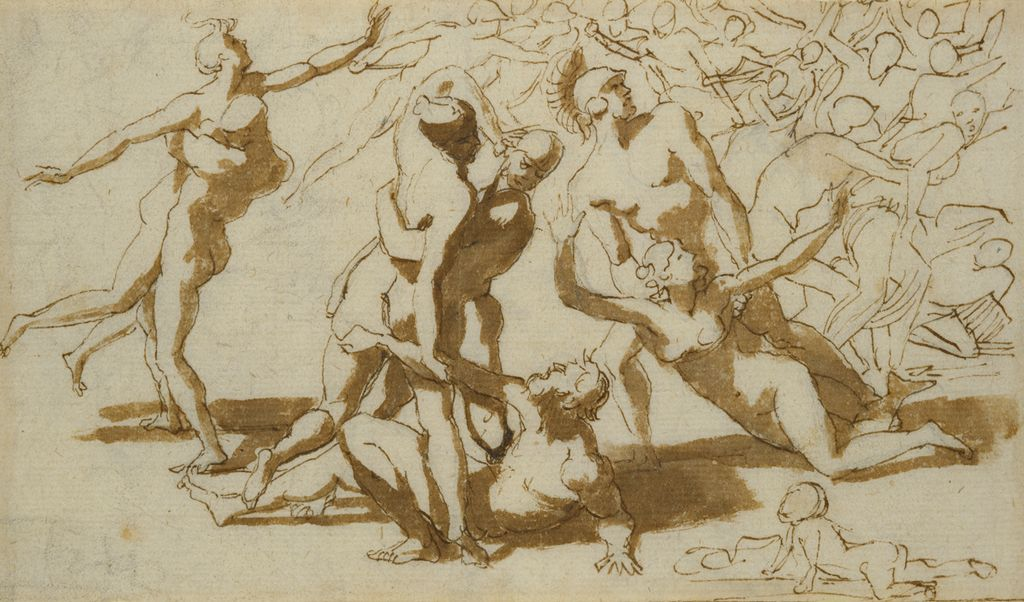
The Rape of the Sabine women, c. 1633 (Royal Collection, Windsor Castle)

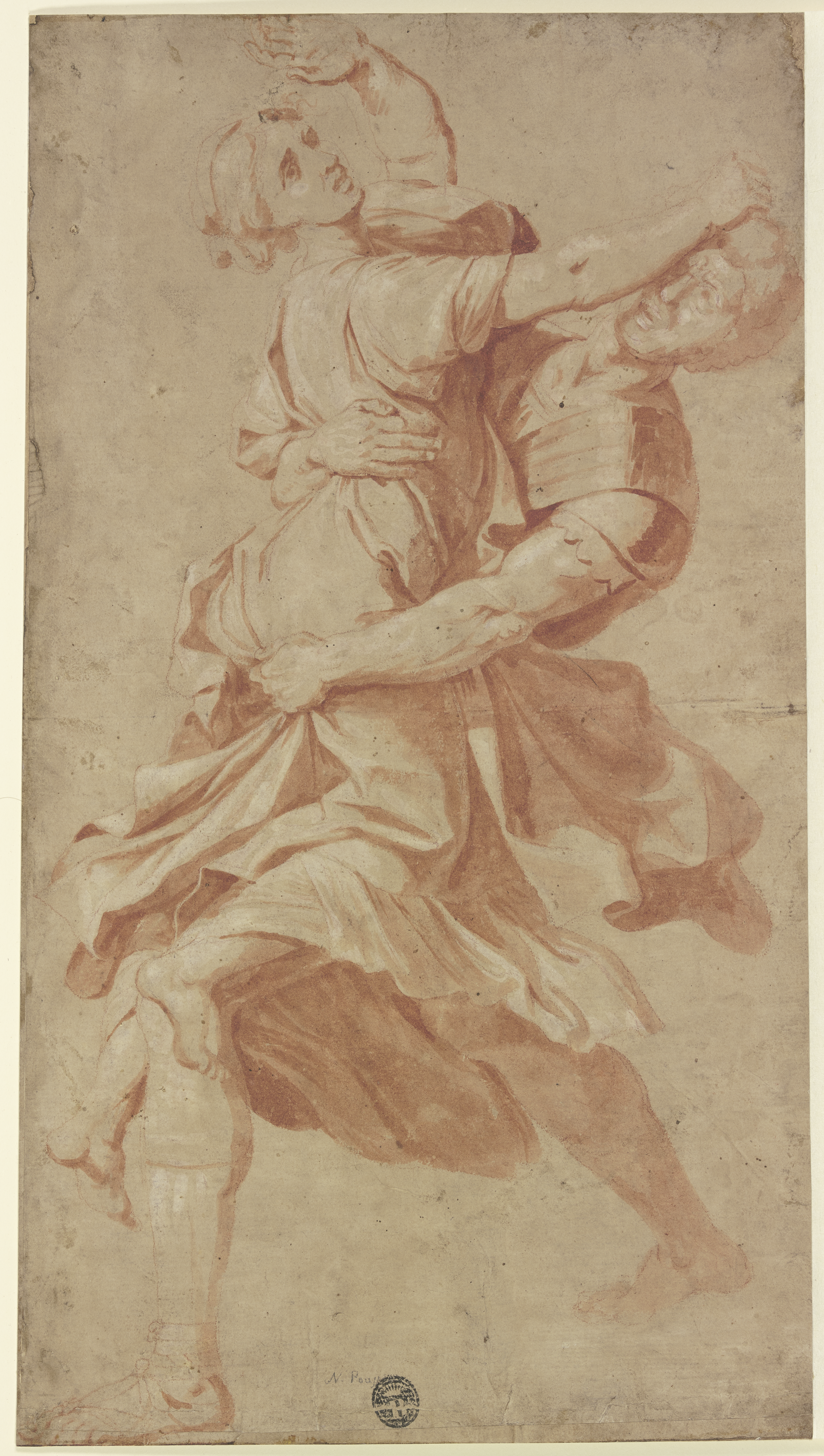
Two figures from the Rape of the Sabine Women (Städel)

== Braun-Vega’s appropriations ==
In 1974, the Peruvian painter Herman Braun-Vega, living in Paris, made a technical and iconographic study of The Rape of the Sabine Women of the Louvre Museum to produce his series of twenty paintings on The Rape of the Sabine Women by Poussin, which he transposed into contemporary French and international reality. He is particularly interested in the relationship between civilians and the military, in aggression, and in political and social violence, universal themes of Poussin's painting which he updates in the context of the 1970s.

In this series, Braun-Vega adopts a "Poussin-like" style - a cold and rigorous plastic construction - which he contrasts with a chromatic warmth and the insertion of contemporary patterns, such as everyday consumer objects or press clippings, to highlight the violence of his time, notably the 1973 Chilean coup d'état or the attack on the Saint-Germain drugstore in Paris. He hijacks the elements of Poussin's painting, putting them into perspective with trivial or contemporary elements, trompe-l'œil still lifes (for example, Tiens, voilà du boudin, L'enlèvement à la baguette), to offer an ironic and critical look at modern society and consumer culture. His approach is not one of parody, but of values transfer, seeking above all to demonstrate the continuity of art.

The appropriation of The Rape of the Sabine Women in Braun-Vega's work does not stop with this series. In addition to the three serigraphs produced at the same time (L'enlèvement à la miche de pain, L'enlèvement au Bain-Vapeur and Poids culturel), there are references to this painting by Poussin in 1981 in Bonjour Monsieur Poussin, and then in 2007 in Mémoires (Poussin), and finally in 2012 in Casse-croûte de campagne (Poussin) and La chair du sectarisme (Ingres, Poussin) with the constant questioning of contemporary social and political realities.

== See also ==
- List of paintings by Nicolas Poussin
- The Intervention of the Sabine Women

== Bibliography ==
- Bellori, Giovanni Pietro (2005) [1672]. The Lives of the Modern Painters, Sculptors and Architects. Translated by Wohl, Alice Sedgwick; Wohl, Hellmut; Montanari, Tomaso. USA: Cambridge University Press. p. 329. ISBN 978-0-521-78187-9.
- Blunt, Anthony (1966). The Paintings of Nicolas Poussin. Critical Catalogue. London: Phaidon. pp. 127–129, nos. 179, 180.
- Brockwell, Maurice (1915). Cook, Herbert (ed.). A Catalogue of the Paintings at Doughty House, Richmond, & Elsewhere In the Collection of Sir Frederick Cook, Bt., Visconde de Monserrate. Vol. 3. London: William Heinemann. p. 49 (no. 430).
- Champlin, John Denison Jr.; Perkins, Charles C., eds. (1887). Cyclopedia of Painters and Paintings. Vol. 4. New York: Charles Scribner's Sons. pp. 96–97.
- Costello, Jane (1947). "The Rape of the Sabine Women by Nicolas Poussin". The Metropolitan Museum of Art Bulletin. 5 (8): 197–204. doi:10.2307/3257295. JSTOR 3257295.
- Friedlaender, Walter (1966). Nicolas Poussin: A New Approach. The Library of Great Painters. New York: Harry N. Abrams, Inc. pp. 142–145.
- Smith, John (1837). A Catalogue Raisonné of the Works of the Most Eminent Dutch, Flemish and French Painters: Nicholas Poussin, Claude Lorraine, and Jean Baptist Greuze. Vol. 8. London: Smith and Son. pp. 91 (no. 169), 92 (no. 170).
- Thompson, James (1992). "Nicolas Poussin". The Metropolitan Museum of Art Bulletin. 50 (3): 25–37. doi:10.2307/3259008. JSTOR 3259008.
- Wolfthal, Diane (1999). Images of Rape: The "Heroic" Tradition and Its Alternatives. New York: Cambridge University Press. ISBN 9780521583114. OCLC 185339562.
- Wright, Christopher (1985). Poussin. Paintings. A Catalogue Raisonné. England: Harlequin Books Ltd. pp. 53 (no. 34), 179 (no. 84). ISBN 978-0-87052-218-5.
- Wright, Christopher (2007). Poussin. Paintings. A Catalogue Raisonné. London: Chaucer Press. pp. 111, 116, 121 (no. 84), 143 (no. 101), 288, 300. ISBN 978-1-904449-58-4.
