= Adoration of the Magi (Fra Angelico and Filippo Lippi) =

Painting by Fra Angelico and Filippo Lippi

Fra Angelico and Fra Filippo Lippi, Adoration of the Magi, c. 1440/1460

The Adoration of the Magi is a tondo, or circular painting, of the Adoration of the Magi assumed to be the work recorded in 1492 in the Palazzo Medici Riccardi in Florence as by Fra Angelico. It dates from the mid-15th century and is now in the National Gallery of Art in Washington, D.C. Most art historians think that Filippo Lippi painted more of the original work, and that it was added to some years after by other artists, as well as including work by assistants in the workshops of both the original masters. It has been known as the Washington Tondo and Cook Tondo after Herbert Cook, and this latter name in particular continues to be used over 50 years after the painting left the Cook collection.

The tondo is painted in tempera on a wood panel, and the painted surface has a diameter of 137.3 cm (54 1/16 in.). The National Gallery of Art dates it to "c. 1440/1460".

Art historians are agreed that the painting was produced over a considerable period, with significant changes in the composition, and contributions from a number of hands. While some are critical of the discordances this history has produced, for John Walker, the second director of the National Gallery of Art, the result was

among the greatest Florentine paintings in the world. It is a climax of beauty, a summary in itself of the whole evolution of the Italian schools of painting in the first half of the fifteenth century. For it stands at a crossroad of art. The old style, the gay, colorful, fairy tale painting of the Middle Ages, is ending in an outburst of splendor; and the new style, scientific in observation, studious in anatomy and perspective, realistic in its portrayal of life, is beginning its long development.

== Description ==
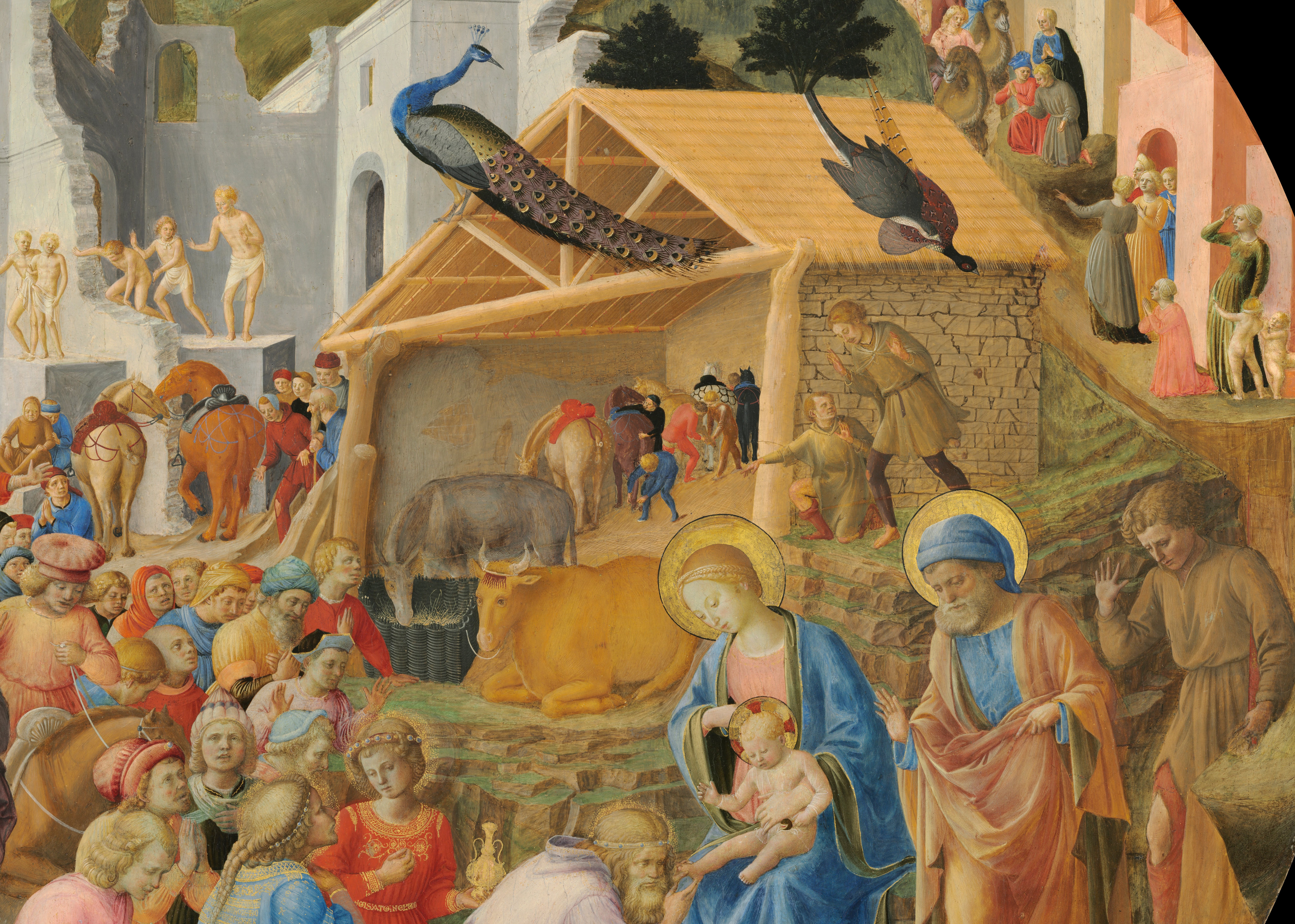
Detail of the central area

The painting shows the three Magi or "kings" presenting their gifts to the infant Jesus, who is held by his mother. Saint Joseph stands beside her, and the manger, ox and ass of the usual depiction of the Nativity are behind this main group. Thus far the composition contains the inevitable components in a very standard arrangement.

As very often, the subject has been combined with the Adoration of the Shepherds, who are represented by three figures in ragged dress, one behind Joseph, and two at the right side of the stable building behind. Only the first of these is looking at Jesus and Mary, from an oblique angle almost behind them. Of the other two, the kneeling one points in the direction of the manger, well behind the sacred figures. The manger is placed outside the stable, and the ox and ass are also in the open air. The interior of the stable is occupied by what are presumably the Magi's horses and their grooms, removing their tack and in one case checking a horseshoe.

Behind the magi on the left a large procession of their retinues continue to arrive, passing through an arch that is part of a large ruined structure. To the right of the main group the city walls of Bethlehem run up a steep slope, with a road or path running in front of the walls. Down this path another large group, presumably more of the Magi's party, is coming, riding on camels and horses. A number of townsfolk have come out through a gateway in the walls, and are looking and pointing, in one case kneeling in prayer, but all looking in a different direction from the final location of the main figures. At the top of the hill a large but indistinctly painted group form a crowd, perhaps funnelling down the narrow path.

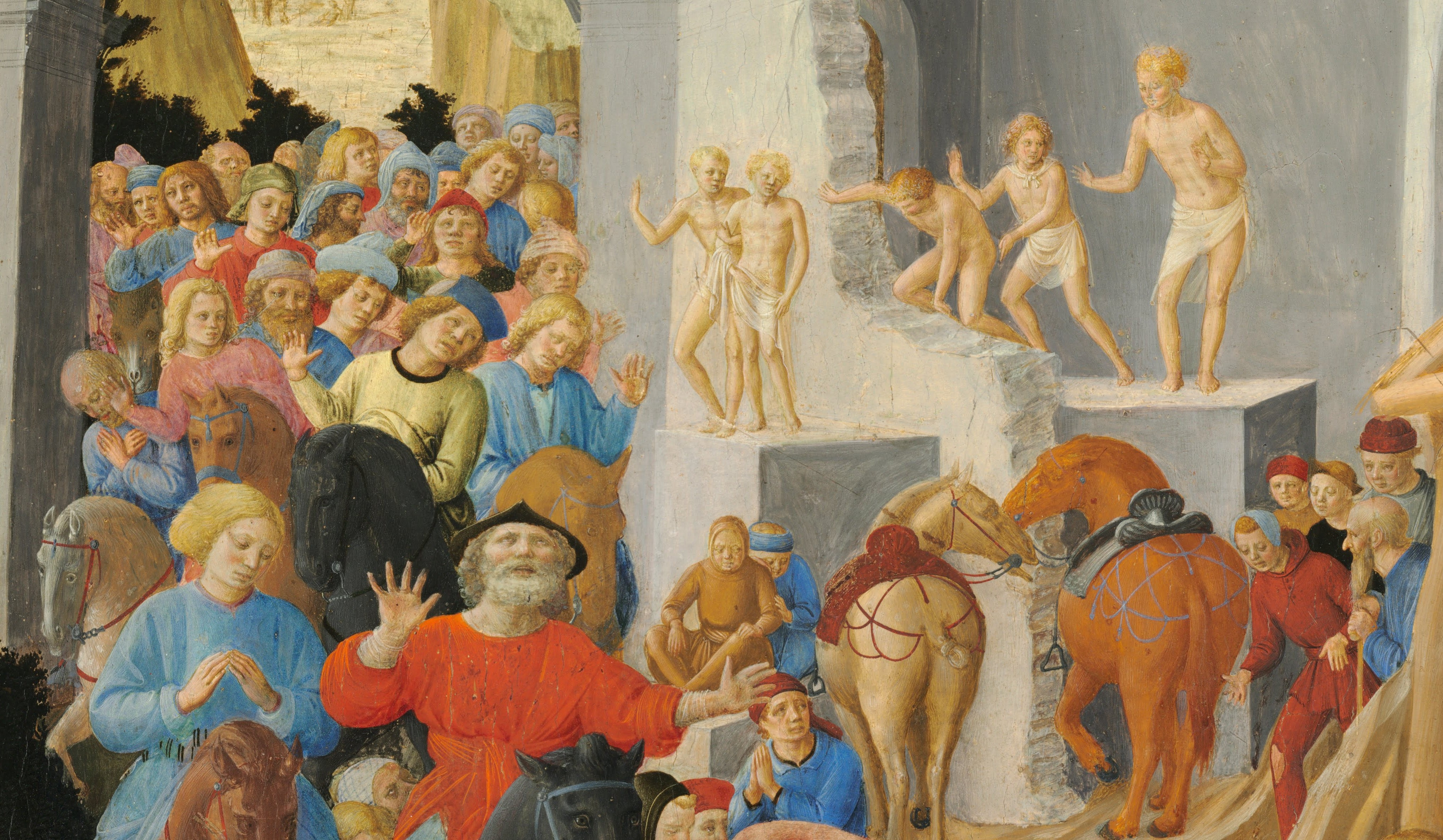
Detail around the arch

On the top of the stable a large peacock perches, looking over his shoulder. There are two other birds to his right, which have been identified as a goshawk seizing a pheasant. Though they look as though they too are on the roof they should be imagined as in flight in mid-air in front of it. This partly explains their discrepancy in scale with the two shepherds below them, though perhaps not entirely.

The painting is marked by several such discrepancies, to a degree that is somewhat surprising in a work of this date, and probably mostly explained by the spatial complexity of the composition, and the number of changes as it developed. The peacock's feet clearly grasp the end of a beam from the stable roof, but the bird is far too large compared to the figures and animals below him in the middle ground. Another of the most obvious discrepancies in scale is around the arch to the left, between the size of the figures of the procession coming through the arch, and those of the locals and unmounted horses to the right of the arch. Who the nearly naked youths standing on the ruins are supposed to represent has puzzled art historians, but their compositional function seems clearly to be to suggest a grander scale for the building than the procession through the arch would do. They also represent "an early indication of that preoccupation with human anatomy, which was to obsess Italian artists until it reached its climax with Michelangelo."

== Stages of painting ==
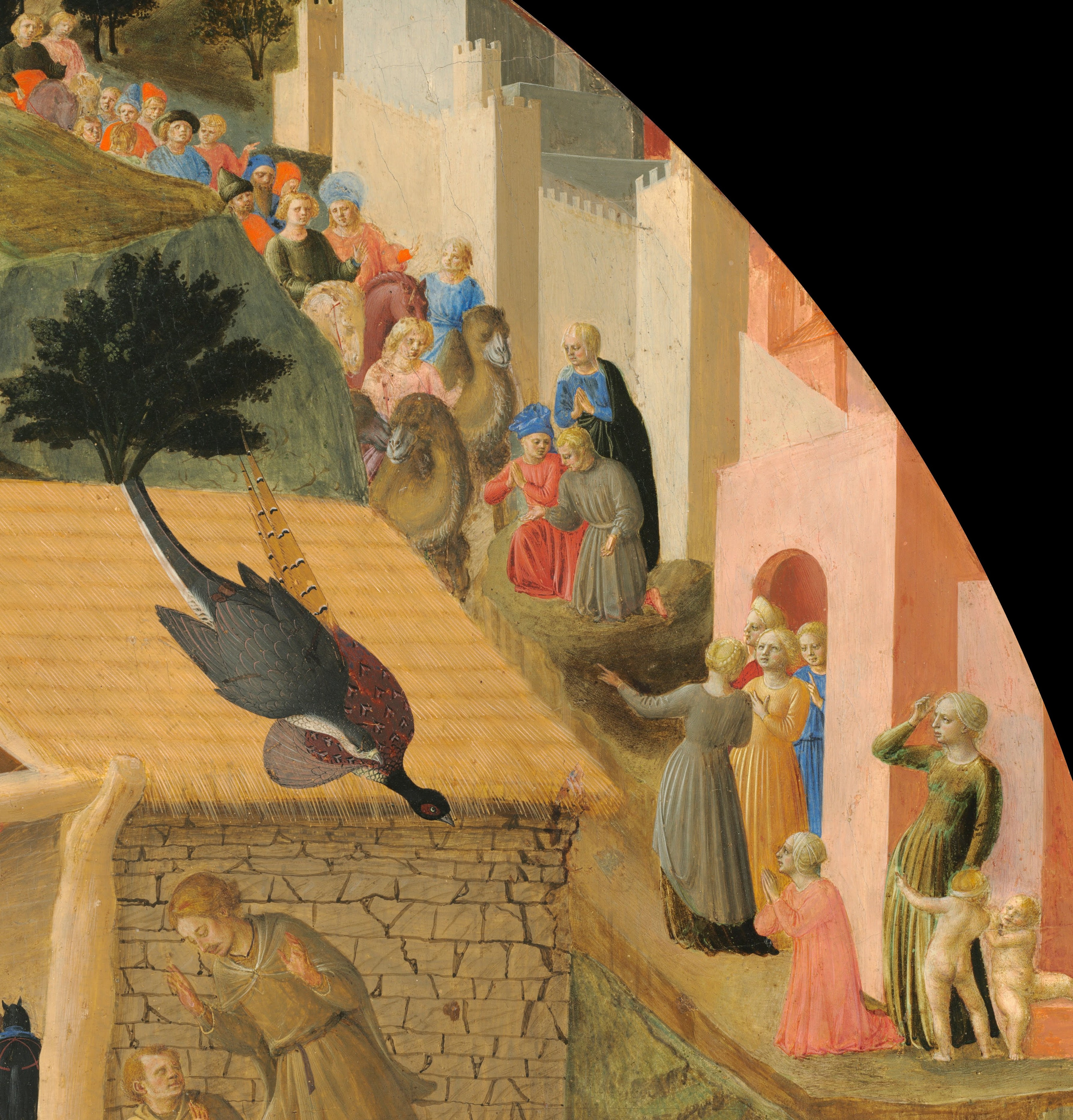
Detail probably including work from three phases

The painting as it now appears is believed to have developed in several stages. In the usual reconstruction, first advanced by Bernard Berenson, the painting was begun by Fra Angelico and his workshop, probably in the 1440s. The hand of Fra Angelico himself is detected in the face of the Virgin Mary, but other parts of the painting seem to be by assistants. The small figures on the steep path at the right of the painting fit his workshop stylistically, and it has been pointed out that the direction they face, and in which some point, does not relate well to the composition as it is today. The same can also be said of many of the smaller figures on the left side of the work. Angelico's workshop was very busy, and his career was dogged by a number of disputes over uncompleted commissions. Progress on the tondo seems to have stalled. At some point, perhaps upon Angelico's death in 1455, the unfinished work appears to have passed to the workshop of Filippo Lippi, the other main Florentine painter of the period. Both Angelico and Lippi worked on other commissions for the Medici family, then at the peak of their wealth and power.

The whole stable has been described as "an awkward later addition", perhaps occupying a space once intended for the main figures, and the peacock and other birds on the roof of the stable are painted over finished areas, rather than areas "reserved" as would be the case if they had been planned from the start. They appear to come from an even later phase of painting, and have been connected with emblems adopted by Cosimo de' Medici's sons Piero (1416–1469) and Giovanni (1421–1463). The former used a falcon holding a ring, with the motto "SEMPER" ("always" or "for ever" in Latin) and the latter a peacock with the motto "REGARDE-MOI" ("Watch me" in French). Together with the dog on the grass at the bottom of the painting, they were perhaps added by Benozzo Gozzoli around the time he was working on the famous fresco cycle of the Magi Chapel in the Medici Palace in 1459–1461. Gozzoli was a former member of Fra Angelico's workshop who by then ran his own studio. The chapel frescos also centre on elaborate processions of the Magi, and include several birds, and feathers, one of which is a goshawk, and another a peacock in a very similar pose to the one in the tondo.

== History ==
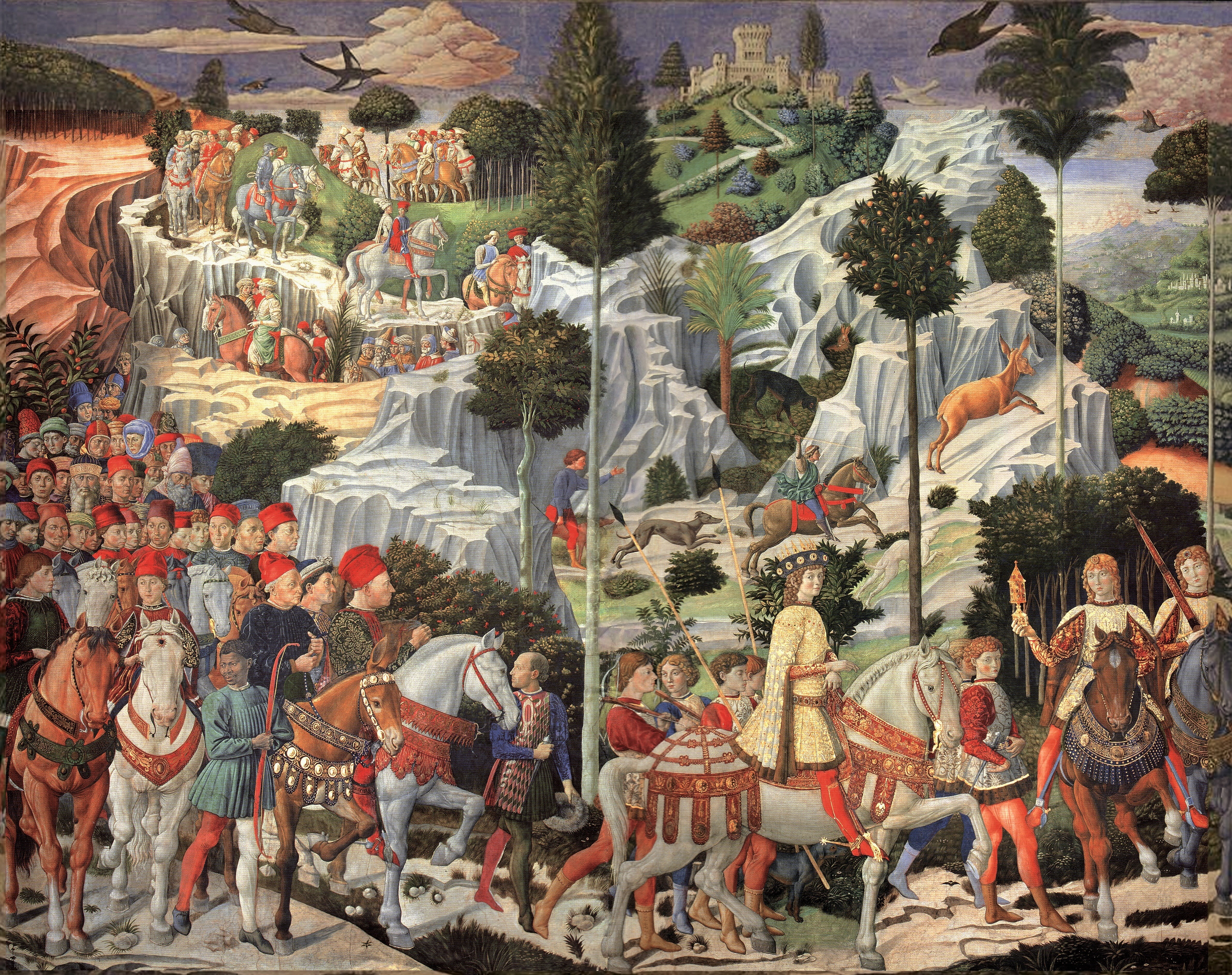
Eastern wall of the Medici Magi chapel, The Procession of the Youngest Magi, 1459–1461, Benozzo Gozzoli

The painting has been generally identified with one recorded in an inventory of the contents of the Medici Palace made in 1492 after the death of Lorenzo the Magnificent, by which time the painting was several decades old. It was in one of the ground floor "grand rooms" that also contained the three large paintings of The Battle of San Romano that are the best known works of Paolo Uccello, and are now divided between London, Paris and Florence. It was given a larger value than these, or any other painting in the palace:

A large tondo with a gilt frame depicting our Lady and our Lord and the Magi who come to make an offering, from the hand of fra'Giovanni: f. 100.

From at least the late 16th century it belonged to the Florentine Guicciardini family, but it was sold in July 1810 to Chevalier François-Honoré Dubois, chief of police in Florence during the Napoleonic occupation, described as by Botticelli. It was sold again in London in 1826 and then remained in England until World War II, passing through a number of collections, and attributed to a number of artists: Fra Angelico in 1826, Filippo Lippi in 1849, Filippino Lippi in 1874. It ended in the important collection of Sir Francis Cook and subsequent Cook Baronets in Doughty House, Richmond, Surrey. In 1941 it was one of 25 pictures from the Cook collection sent to the United States for safe-keeping during the war. It was due to return in 1947 but was sold just before the voyage. It was bought by the Samuel H. Kress Foundation, New York (attributed to Filippo Lippi), and in 1952 it was donated to the National Gallery of Art.

== Iconography and context ==
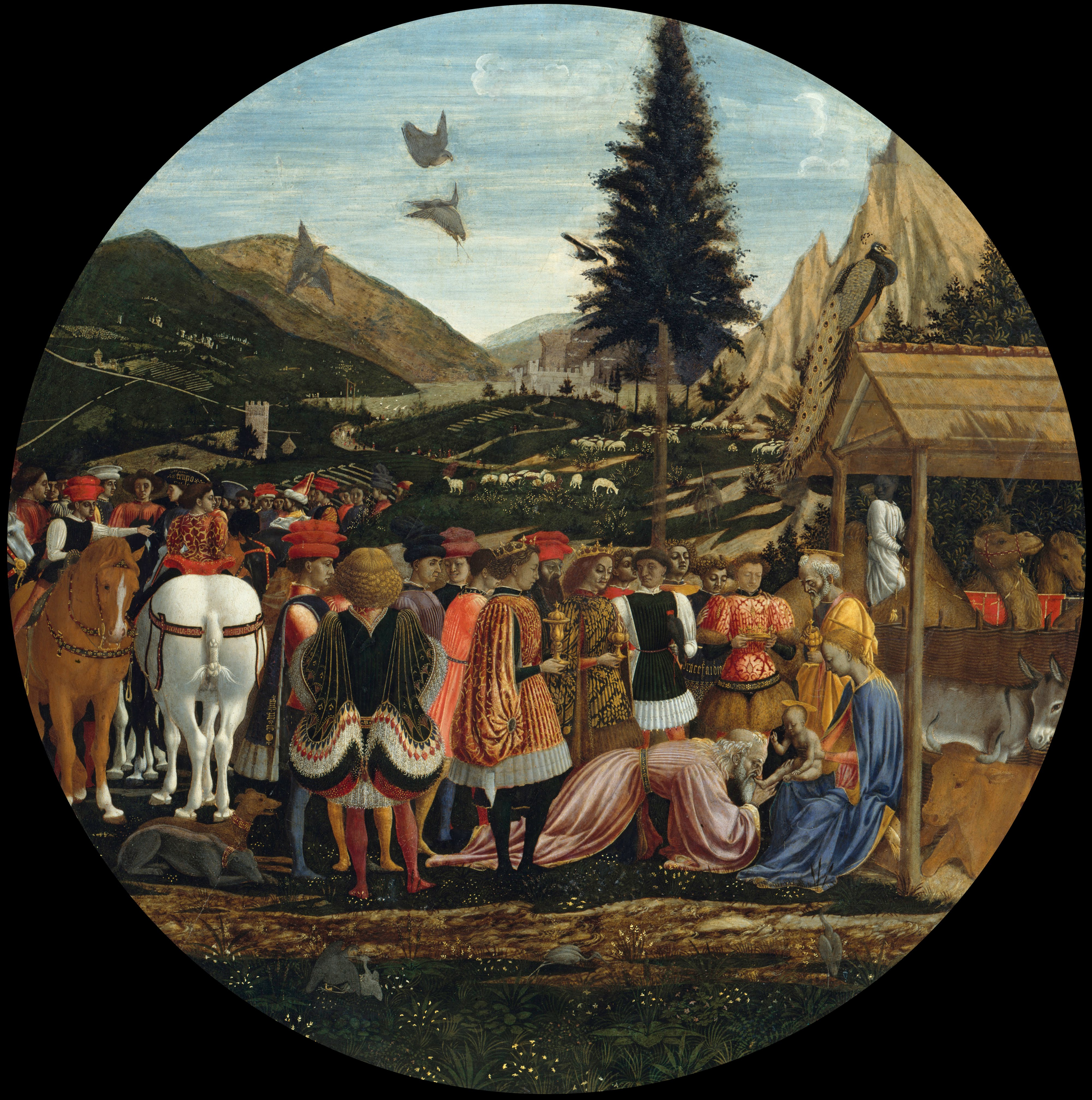
Domenico Veneziano, Adoration of the Magi, Gemäldegalerie, Berlin, probably a Medici commission of c. 1439–1442

A high quality Florentine tondo featuring the Magi would be suspected of originating with a Medici commission even without the evidence of the inventory, as the family had a very particular interest in both the subject and the form. The Magi had been the key Medici devotion for decades, apparently beginning with the papacy of Antipope John XXIII (1410–1415) when they had become the main bankers of the Papacy, or at least those parts John controlled. The Medici belonged to the Compagnia de' Magi, a Florentine confraternity based at the San Marco complex just by the Medici Palace, both of which Cosimo de' Medici rebuilt a few years before the tondo was painted. An annual procession on the feast of the Epiphany on January 6 was organized by the confraternity, and passed in front of the Medici Palace. It was a costumed re-enactment of their arrival at the nativity, with the main parts taken by the leading members, including the Medici and their associates. The Magi were regarded as saints, and so in the tondo have rather unusual halos of gold dots, unlike the discs of the Holy Family. Their combination of sainthood with the possession and giving of luxury goods may have been a factor in their attraction for the Medici.

The tondo shape for large paintings may itself have been a Medici innovation, possibly representing the gold ring with a diamond that became used as a device by the family from the 1440s. The shape probably represents an inflation of the far smaller painted desco da parto or "birthing-tray", a decorated wooden tray, round or twelve-sided, that was traditionally presented by a Florentine husband to his wife after childbirth, and then used for serving refreshments to her visitors as she lay in state for a period of days after. The same 1492 inventory that probably records the tondo shows that Lorenzo de' Medici kept the desco da parto presented on his own birth in 1449 hanging on his bedroom wall until his death. These desci were typically decorated with allegorical or mythological scenes, while the large tondo was mostly used for religious subjects. But the shape was not found in paintings for churches, and may have carried a deliberate suggestion of a commission for a palace.

Apart from the tondo being discussed, another with a loosely similar composition showing the Adoration of the Magi, by Domenico Veneziano (now Gemäldegalerie, Berlin) is probably a Medici commission of c. 1439–1442; it may also be another painting recorded in the 1492 inventory (though that Magi tondo is there attributed to Pesellino). Among other similarities it also has a peacock perched on the stable roof, and falconry imagery, with hawks attacking cranes both in the air and on the ground. The figure in black and white, behind the Magi and holding a falcon, may be a portrait of Piero de' Medici. There were several other important images of the Magi made for the Medici, apart from these and those in the palace chapel. The 1492 inventory lists four paintings, three probably from the period of Cosimo. Later, Botticelli was to paint several Medici portraits in his 1475 painting in the Uffizi, commissioned by a close associate of the family. A Botticelli Magi tondo in the National Gallery, London of around 1470–1475 has a comparable screen of ruined antique buildings running behind the main figures (as well as a peacock). Cosimo's personal cell in San Marco has a fresco Magi scene by Fra Angelico.

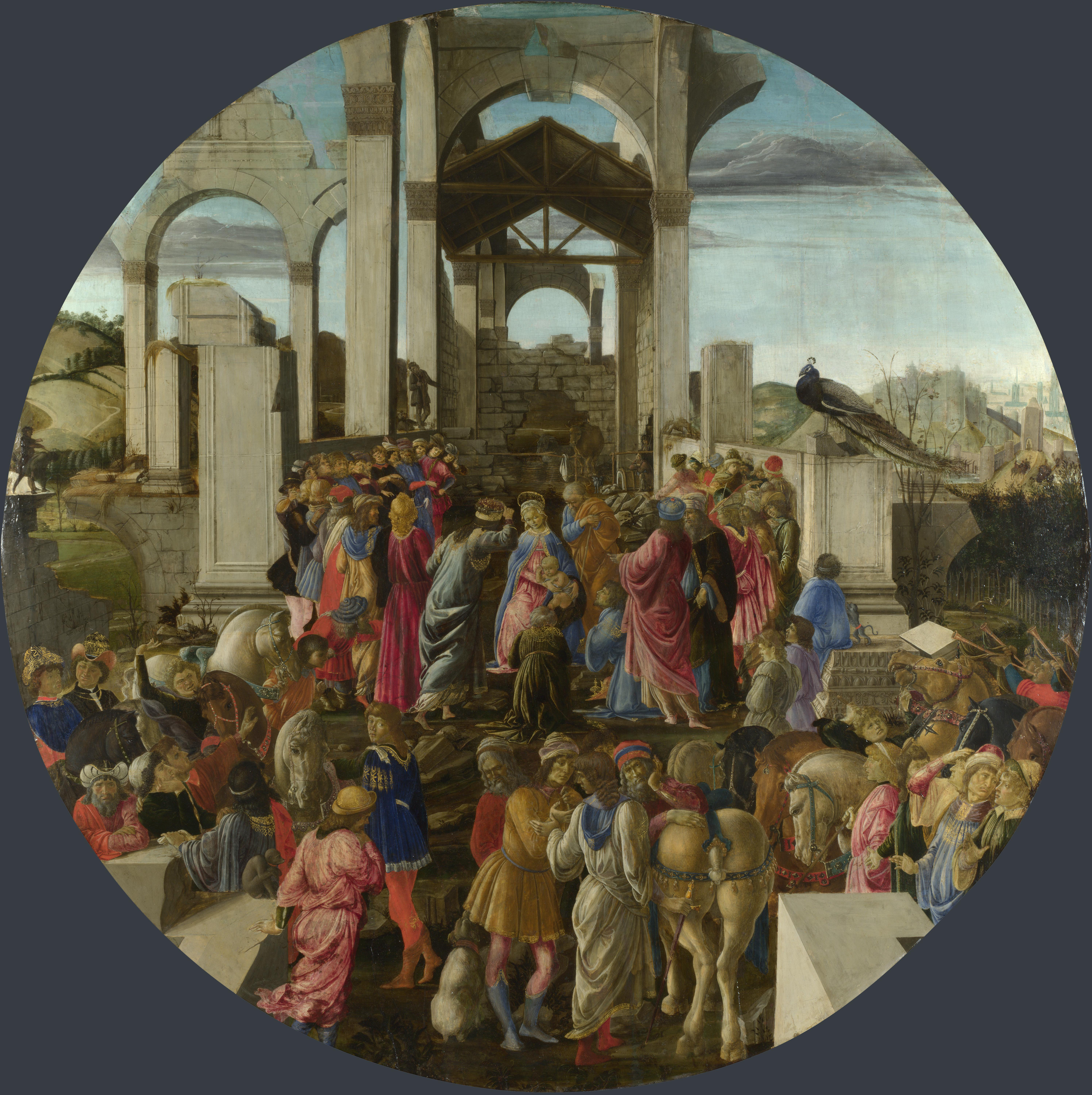
The Botticelli Magi tondo in London

A number of aspects of the arrangement of the figures and the general composition are probably borrowed from a Magi scene of about 1370–71 by Jacopo di Cione that was then part of his large altarpiece at the nearby church (now destroyed) of San Pier Maggiore. The altarpiece is now dispersed, but the majority of the panels, including the Magi scene, are in the National Gallery, London.

More general meanings that were attached to objects in the painting include the pomegranate held by the Christ child, whose many seeds were regarded as symbolizing the souls in the care of the church. The flesh of the peacock was thought to resist decay, and so the bird symbolized eternity, and the Resurrection of Jesus.

=== The buildings to the rear ===
A grand but "crumbling pagan building" is a very common feature of Renaissance Nativity scenes, often acting as the stable itself. This generally represents the passing of the era of the Mosaic law and contract, replaced at the birth of Christ by the new Christian covenant. But it also often includes an allusion to the legend that on the night of Christ's birth the "Temple of Peace" in the Roman Forum fell down, in fulfilment of a prophecy of Apollo that it would stand until a virgin gave birth. This was in the Golden Legend and other sources; it supposedly contained a statue of Romulus.

In the 15th century the "Temple of Peace" was wrongly identified with the Basilica of Maxentius next door, in fact a building of 308–312 AD. About a third of this building survives today, with the three enormous barrel vaults of the north aisle the largest Roman structures surviving in the Forum. It also contained a colossal statue, that of Constantine, whose head, hand, foot, and other bits are now in the courtyard of the Palazzo dei Conservatori on the Capitoline Hill. Other Nativity paintings draw from the architecture of the ruins of the basilica, including the Botticelli tondo in London, and the Lippi seems to do so too. Architectural historians remark that the architecture of the basilica drew from the massive public bath complexes of Rome, and possibly some awareness of this similarity led Lippi to represent his nude figures on the ruins as bathers, who might be imagined coming out from a still-functional bathing part of the complex to see what all the noise was about.
