= Tennessee Claflin =

American suffragist (1844–1923)

Tennessee Celeste Claflin, Viscountess of Monserrate
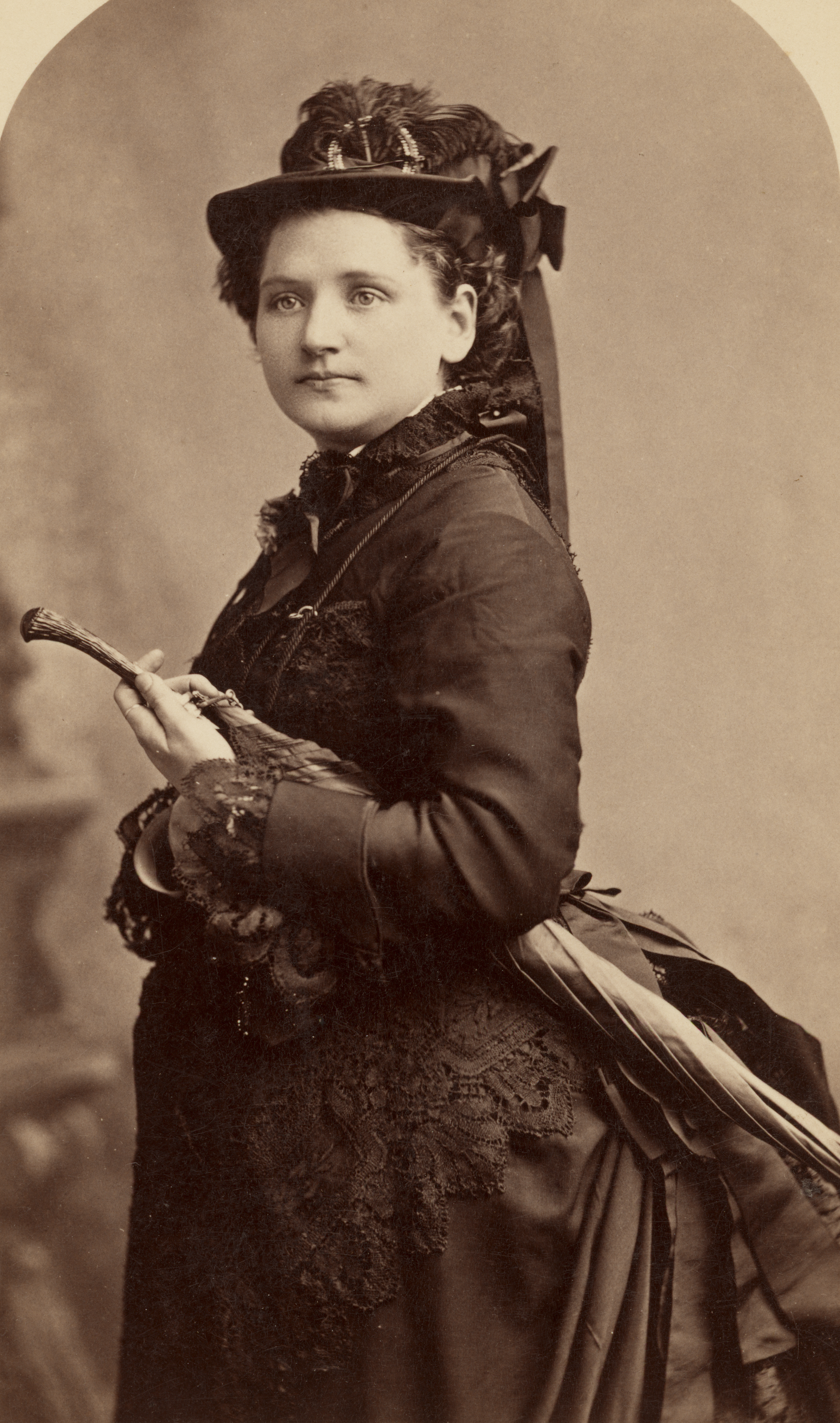
- Born: October 26, 1844; Homer, Ohio, United States
- Died: January 18, 1923 (aged 78); England
- Other names: Tennie
- Title: Lady Cook, Viscountess of Monserrate
- Spouse: Francis Cook, 1st Viscount of Monserrate (m. 1885; died 1901)
- Relatives: Victoria Woodhull (sister)

Tennessee Celeste Claflin, Viscountess of Monserrate (October 26, 1844 – January 18, 1923), also known as Tennie C., was an American suffragist best known as the first woman, along with her sister Victoria Woodhull, to open a Wall Street brokerage firm, which occurred in 1870.

== Early life and education ==
Tennessee Claflin's exact birth date is unclear, but she is generally reported to have been born between 1843 and 1846. Biographer Myrna MacPherson cites Claflin's date of birth as October 26, 1845, while journalist Barbara Goldsmith cites a birth year of 1846. It is clear however, that Tennessee Claflin was the last of ten children born to Roxanna Hummel Claflin and Reuben Buckman Claflin in Homer, Ohio. A sister, Utica Claflin Brooker, was born between 1841 and 1843. A poem was written about the three sisters:

Victoria, Utica, and Tennessee

Three sisters fair, of worth and weight,
A queen, a city, and a State—
At least from such each takes her name—
And all were largely known to fame.

Two of them took an early start
To practice in the healing art,
The other traveled far and near,
And visited each hemisphere.

All were geniuses most rare,
Of for genteel and features fair.
By as great space they were separate
As Buckeye from the Golden State.

Reuben Buckman Claflin, known as "Buck," was a snake oil salesman who posed as a doctor. He had some legal training and sometimes presented himself as a lawyer. His work experiences included ferrying timber down the Susquehanna River and working in a saloon.

He came from an impoverished branch of the Massachusetts-based Scots-American Claflin family, semi-distant cousins to Governor William Claflin.

In December 1825, Buck Claflin married Roxanna Hummel, sometimes called "Roxy". The couple met in Selinsgrove, Pennsylvania when Buck was a guest at the house where Roxanna worked as a maid.

Roxanna has been identified at various times as the niece of a prosperous saloon owner and as the illegitimate daughter of a maid. She spoke with a German accent. She may have been a spiritualist.

The Claflin children grew up in poverty. Neighbors remembered them as wild, dirty, and hungry. Buck was an abusive father who regularly beat his children without provocation.

Inspired by the success of the Fox Sisters, Buck began advertising Tennessee and Victoria as mediums around 1852. The girls soon became the family's main breadwinners.

In 1853, elder sister Victoria married and moved away.

== Spiritualism and healing ==
By 1860, Tennessee was advertised as a precocious fortune teller with the ability to cure diseases "from cold sores to cancer." Consultations cost $1 and Tennessee worked 13-hour days in small towns across the Midwest. Buck sold "Miss Tennessee's Magnetio Elixir" (a worthless concoction) for $2.

In 1863, Buck rented an entire hotel in Ottawa, Illinois. He called himself "The King of Cancer" and advertised Tennessee's healing abilities. As part of their practice, the Claflins used lye which burned their patient's skin. In June 1864, the police raided the Claflins' hotel clinic and the family fled. Authorities charged the family with nine crimes including disorderly conduct and medical fraud (quackery). Tennessee faced the most serious charge as she was blamed for the death of a patient named Rebecca Howe. The family never went to court for their fake cancer cure.

In the Fall of 1868, Buck visited business magnate Cornelius Vanderbilt who Buck had heard was interested in massage and magnetic healing. Buck pitched Victoria as a spiritualist and Tennessee as a healer. Tennessee and Cornelius began to spend a lot of time together and an affair was strongly rumored.

== Wall Street and publishing ==
In late 1869, Victoria Woodhull and Tennessee Claflin rented two rooms at the posh Hoffman House at 44 Broad Street in New York City. In January 1870, they sent out calling cards announcing their new brokerage firm, Woodhull, Claflin, & Company. They charged $25 in advance for a consultation. The sisters were financially backed by Cornelius Vanderbilt. The elegantly furnished office of Woodhull, Claflin, & Company opened on February 14, 1870. This made Woodhull and Clafin the first women to open a Wall Street brokerage firm. The sisters were so besieged by curious visitors that 100 police officers had to keep order.

In an article entitled "Wall-Street Aroused," The New York Times questioned the sisters' potential for success, not because they were women, but because of their association with spiritualism and other unorthodox causes. Harper’s Weekly dubbed them "Bewitching Brokers" in a cartoon while another article in the magazine questioned whether there were enough female investors to make the firm a success.

Woodhull and Claflin had hit upon an untapped source of investment capital. Society wives and widows, teachers, small-business owners, actresses, and high-priced prostitutes and their madams sought out Woodhull, Claflin, & Company and the firm was an immediate financial triumph. The sisters soon rented an expensive apartment on 38th Street in the exclusive Murray Hill district of Manhattan.

With the profits from their brokerage, the sisters started their own radical newspaper, Woodhull & Claflin's Weekly. Woodhull and Claflin used their newspaper to advocate for Free Love, a movement which in the nineteenth century pushed to separate sex from marriage. The Free Love movement was considered very fringe at this time and their advocacy of the movement shocked many. As biographer Myra McPherson explained, “In arguing that a woman had a right to freedom regarding her own body, to choose her mate, to decide when she wanted sex, and actually to enjoy it, the sisters were so far ahead of the era that they were openly called prostitutes in print.” Woodhull & Claflin’s Weekly was also the first paper in America to print The Communist Manifesto.

The brokerage firm of Woodhull, Claflin, & Company went under in the general economic depression that followed the Panic of 1873.

== Politics ==
In 1871, the sisters tried to vote in a municipal election and were rebuffed.

On August 11, 1871, Tennessee Claflin announced her candidacy for New York's Eighth Congressional District. At that time, the Eighth Congressional District was largely German-American. Claflin announced her candidacy at Irving Plaza surrounded by German and American flags. She delivered her speech in German.

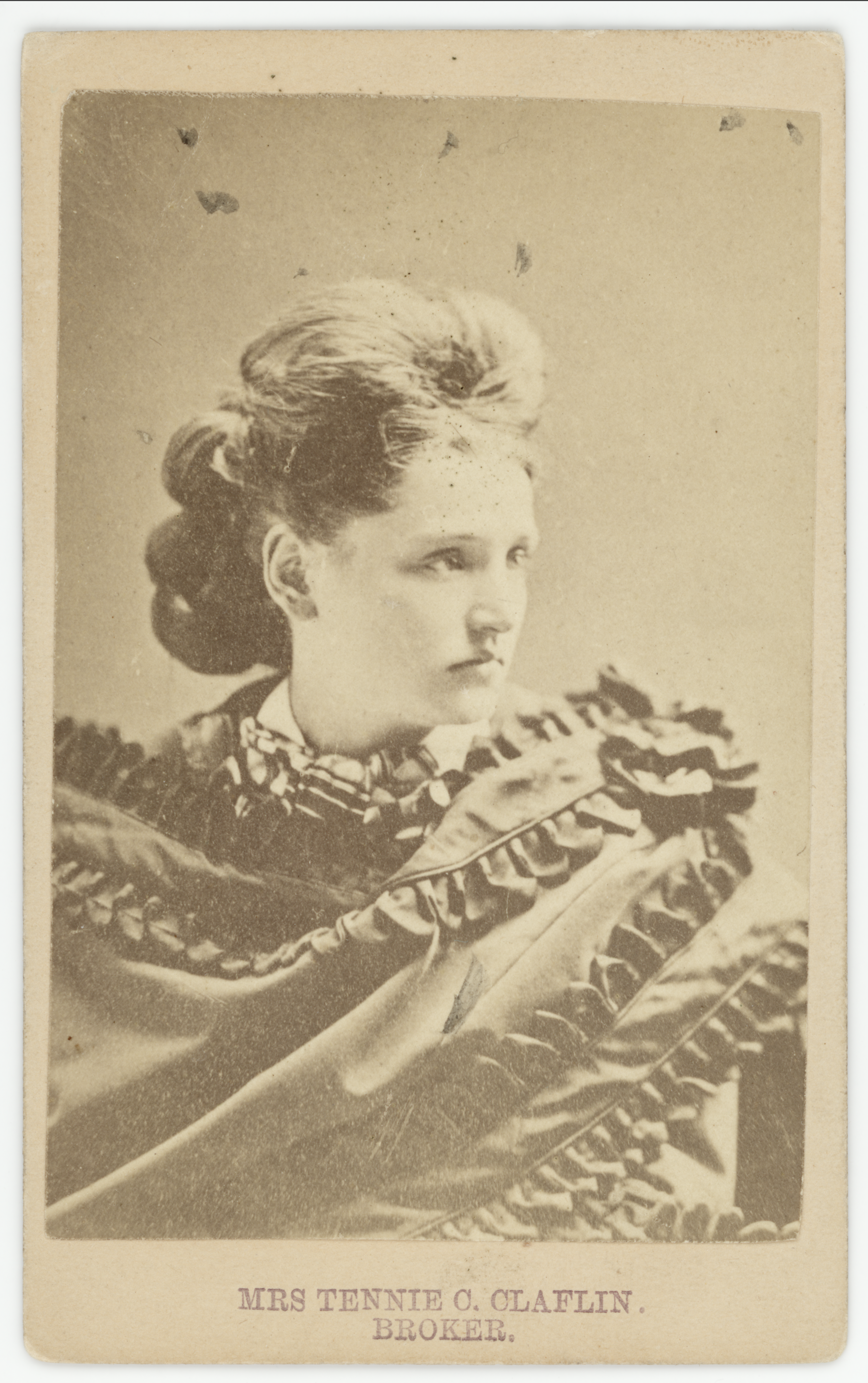
1872 photograph of Tennessee Claflin

Woodhull was nominated for President of the United States by the newly formed Equal Rights Party on May 10, 1872. Frederick Douglass was nominated as vice-president but he ignored the nomination and instead actively campaigned for Ulysses S. Grant.

During the summer of 1872, Claflin made a bid for the colonelcy of the Ninth Regiment of the New York National Guard. The post had been vacant since the death of robber baron Jim Fisk in January 1872. Claflin's candidacy was widely mocked by the press. The men of the Ninth Regiment ignored Claflin's offer, but Commander Thomas J. Griffin invited Claflin to run for the colonelcy of the newly organized Eighty-Fifth Regiment for black soldiers. Aware of her past advocacy and her professional success, the members of the Eighty-Fifth elected Claflin colonel.

== Henry Ward Beecher adultery trial and related scandals ==
On November 2, 1872, Woodhull & Claflin's Weekly published a report that triggered the famous adultery trial of Henry Ward Beecher. Beecher was the son of the famous Calvinist theologian Lyman Beecher and the brother of Harriet Beecher Stowe. He was probably the best-known Protestant minister in the United States at that time, earning an immense salary of $100,000 a year as a minister at Plymouth Church in Brooklyn. A leader in the anti-slavery movement, Beecher gained fame as an orator.

One hundred thousand copies of Woodhull & Claflin's Weekly were published on November 2, 1872 with "The Beecher-Tilton Scandal Case" on the cover. The article took the format of an interview between Victoria Woodhull and an unnamed reporter. Woodhull gave all the salacious details of an affair between Henry Ward Beecher and Elizabeth Richards Tilton, wife of Theodore Tilton. Woodhull gave her sources as Elizabeth Cady Stanton, Isabella Beecher Hooker, and Paulina Wright Davis. Letters from the three women were published as corroboration.

In the same issues, Tennessee threatened further revelations about other important men by printing a letter from an anonymous madam who claimed to have recorded the names and addresses of her clients. Although some accused Tennessee of writing this letter herself, journalist Barbara Goldsmith believes the letter came from madam Annie Wood, a friend of both Woodhull and Claflin.

Before the end of the week the November 2 issue had been reprinted and was selling for $40. Woodhull and Claflin spent the next few months in and out of jail on a variety of trumped-up obscenity charges brought by the rising vice crusader Anthony Comstock.

In 1874, Theodore Tilton brought suit against Henry Ward Beecher for "criminal intimacy" with Tilton's wife. The case ran from January to July 1875 and ended in a hung jury.

== London and later life ==
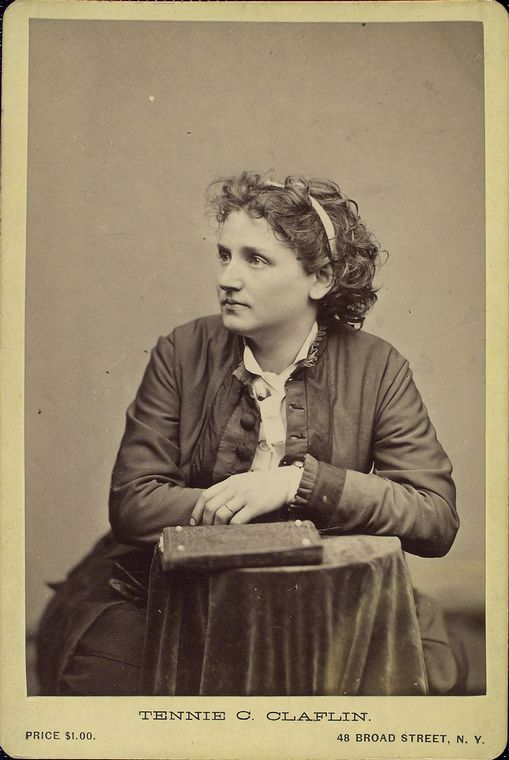
Tennessee Celeste Claflin

In the wake of the Beecher trial, the sisters left New York for London in 1877. Evidence suggests that the sisters' move was funded by the heirs of the recently deceased Cornelius Vanderbilt, who wanted them out of the way during a fight over the family inheritance. Vanderbilt had been widowed in 1868 and had remarried in 1869. The second marriage had surprised Claflin, who expected to marry him herself. But by the middle of 1871, Vanderbilt's family had pushed her out of his life.

On October 15, 1885, at St Mary Abbots, Kensington, London, Claflin married Francis Cook, who was chairman of Cook, Son & Co., drapers, and also Viscount of Monserrate in Sintra on the Portuguese Riviera. Within months of their marriage, Queen Victoria created a Cook Baronetcy. As the wife of a British baronet, Claflin was thereafter correctly styled "Lady Cook", and in Portugal was also Viscountess of Monserrate. The couple lived at Doughty House in Richmond Hill, Surrey, now part of Greater London, and at Monserrate Palace.

Shortly after Cook's death in 1901, Claflin founded a short-lived bank in the City of London called Lady Cook & Co.

Although she never abandoned her radical viewpoints, Claflin lived the remainder of her life out of the public eye. She died in England on January 18, 1923.

== See also ==
- Claflin family
- Doughty House
- International Workingmen's Association in America
