= Sir Christopher Cook, 5th Baronet =

British baronet (born 1938)

Sir Christopher Wymondham Rayner Herbert Cook (born 1938) is a British baronet who is the current holder of the Cook baronetcy of Doughty House. Some Portuguese and heraldic sources also describe him as Visconde de Monserrate.

Cook is a descendant of the family associated with Monserrate Palace in Sintra, Portugal. In 2012,, the Friends of Monserrate reported that he visited Monserrate with members of his family while researching documentary evidence relating to his family’s Portuguese connections.

In 2017, the Jersey Evening Post quoted Cook in relation to the 1958 sale of Salvator Mundi, then part of the Cook family collection, and reported that he was living in Guernsey.
