= Sir Francis Cook, 4th Baronet =

British artist (1907–1978)

Sir Francis Cook Bt
- Born: Francis Ferdinand Maurice Cook; 21 December 1907
- Died: 12 September 1978 (aged 70)
- Education: Bradfield College
- Known for: Painting
- Father: Herbert Cook

Sir Francis Ferdinand Maurice Cook, 4th Baronet (21 December 1907 – 12 September 1978) was a British artist. The only son of Sir Herbert Cook, 3rd Baronet, he was the fourth holder of the Cook Baronetcy, inheriting his father's titles in 1939. After World War II he dispersed the majority of the very important family collection of Old Master paintings.

== Life ==
Educated at Bradfield College, he became an artist, musician and art historian, exhibiting at the Royal Academy. Paintings by Cook appear in the Walker Art Gallery, Liverpool, Manchester, Northampton and Bournemouth. He was also a Fellow of the Royal Society of Arts (1960–78) and an Associate of the Royal Society of British Artists (1938–48). Cook was a founding member of the Jersey Society of Artists, and the Jersey Artists Group.

Forty Dutch pictures from the family art collection were sold to Katz of Dieren in 1939, with more being sold off after the family home of Doughty House was bomb damaged in 1944 – fortunately much of the collection had been transferred to Cothay Manor in Somerset, which he also owned. Cook moved to Jersey in 1960 with the remaining 30 paintings from his collection. Some of his works stored at Le Gallais' depository in Saint Helier were lost in a fire in 1949. Many of these works were later recreated by Cook from photographs.

In 1955 Cook bought a house in Saint Brelade which he restored along with its gardens. These became a subject of a number of paintings. In the 1970s he bought the former Methodist chapel at Les Augrès, Trinity, which he converted to a studio and gallery. The conversion remained unfinished at his death, and on 4 May 1984 his widow made a donation of 1200 paintings to the Jersey Heritage Trust along with the former chapel, which has since been named the Sir Francis Cook Gallery.

In June 1958 Cook sold a painting through Sotheby's for £45 that later became known as Leonardo da Vinci's Salvator Mundi which was sold for $450 million by Christie's to Saudi Prince Badr bin Abdullah bin Mohammed Al Farhan. The family was of the belief that the artist of the piece was Giovanni Antonio Boltraffio, a contemporary and studio mate of da Vinci.

== Marriages ==
1. Molly Violet Mappin, daughter of Thomas Wilson Mappin, on 15 February 1928, divorced in 1930
2. Dorothea Alice Bennett, daughter of Colonel William Bennett, on 25 February 1933, divorced in 1935
3. Joan Loraine Case, daughter of John Aloysius Ashton Case, on 8 June 1937, divorced in 1942
4. Barbara Frances Lang, in October 1942, divorced in 1947
5. Juliet Berry Perkins, daughter of Christopher Edward Perkins, on 5 September 1947, divorced in 1951
6. Jane Audrey Nott, daughter of Christopher Nott, on 10 August 1951, divorced in 1956
7. Bridget Brenda Lynch, daughter of Thomas David Lynch, on 3 December 1956

== Sources ==
- Sir Francis Cook, Carolyn Bailey, Jersey Museums Service, no date

Baronetage of the United Kingdom
Preceded by Herbert Cook	Baronet (of Doughty House); 1939–1978	Succeeded by Christopher Cook
