= Herbert Cook =

British art historian and patron (1868–1939)

Sir Herbert Frederick Cook 3rd Baronet
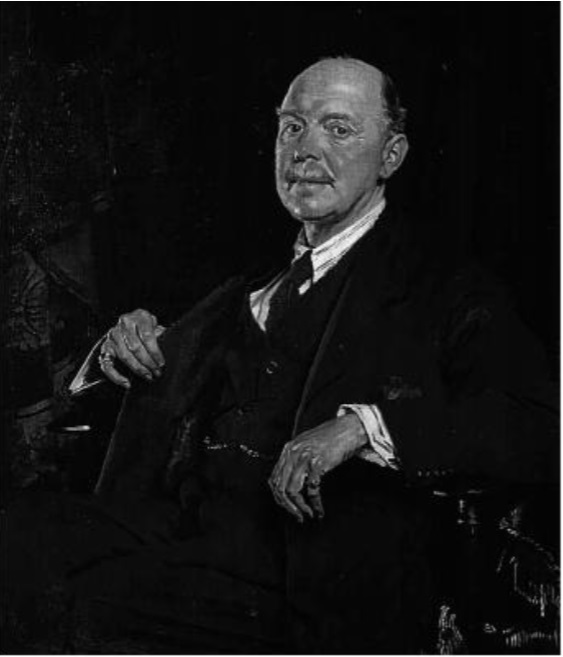
- Portrait of Sir Herbert Cook, by William Orpen
- Born: 18 November 1868
- Died: 4 May 1939 (aged 70)
- Education: Harrow School; Balliol College, Oxford
- Occupation: Art historian
- Spouse: Mary Hood (m. 1898)
- Children: 3
- Father: Sir Frederick Cook
- Relatives: 2nd Viscount Bridport (father-in-law); Francis Cook (son)

Sir Herbert Frederick Cook, 3rd Baronet (18 November 1868 – 4 May 1939) was an English art patron and art historian.

== Life ==
Only son of Sir Frederick Cook, 2nd Baronet, he was educated at Harrow School and Balliol College, Oxford. He was subsequently called to the Bar by the Inner Temple in 1895. He married in 1898 to Mary Hood, daughter of Arthur Hood, 2nd Viscount Bridport, with whom he had one son (Francis, who succeeded him) and two daughters.

In 1920, he succeeded to his father's baronetcy, along with the first baronet's art collection, which he catalogued in three volumes in 1913 and which thereafter became known in art history publications as the "Cook Collection, Doughty House, Richmond". Though he was not a major collector himself, he did add Rembrandt’s Portrait of a boy (Norton Simon Foundation) and Titian’s La Schiavona (National Gallery, London).

== Cook Collection ==
He was an art historian who wrote a catalog raisonné of Giorgione works in 1900, and managed and hosted visits to his family's collection which included a Cima da Conegliano Madonna and Child and two Giorgiones at Doughty House. He was a co-founder of the Art Fund, and in 1903 was founding member of the "Consultative Committee" of The Burlington Magazine. Other members were Harold Dillon, 17th Viscount Dillon and James Lindsay, Lord Balcarres, Sir Martin Conway, Sidney Colvin, Campbell Dodgson, Herbert Horne, Charles Eliot Norton, Claude Phillips, and Roger Fry. Later Roger Fry disagreed with some of Cook's optimistic Giorgione attributions, especially Cook's 1913 acquisition of La Schiavona, which he catalogued as The portrait of Caterina Cornaro by Giorgione (finished by Titian). The other Giorgione in his collection that was purchased in 1907, has since been reattributed to Giovanni Cariani.

He was a member of the Arundel Society and served on committees for foreign exhibitions and organised several in London. In 1930, he also gave £1000 to the University of London for the Courtauld Institute of Art.

== Selected works ==
- Giorgione - 1900
- Volume II, Dutch & Flemish schools, A catalogue of the paintings at Doughty House, Richmond, & elsewhere in the collection of Sir Frederick Cook, bt., Visconde de Monserrate, by Cook, Herbert; Borenius, Tancred, 1885–1948; Kronig, J. O., 1887–1984; Brockwell, Maurice W., 1869–1958, on archive.org

Baronetage of the United Kingdom
Preceded by Frederick Cook	Baronet (of Doughty House); 1920 – 1939	Succeeded by Francis Cook
