= Sir Frederick Cook, 2nd Baronet =

British politician

Sir Frederick Lucas Cook 2nd Baronet
- Cook in 1895

Member of Parliament for Kennington
- In office 1895–1906
- Preceded by: Mark Hanbury Beaufoy
- Succeeded by: Stephen Collins

Personal details
- Born: 21 November 1844
- Died: 21 May 1920 (aged 75)
- Resting place: Richmond Cemetery, London
- Party: Conservative party
- Spouse: Mary Anne Elizabeth Cotton (m. 1868)
- Children: 1
- Parents: Sir Francis Cook (father); Emily Martha Lucas (mother)
- Relatives: Herbert Cook (son)
- Education: Harrow School

Sir Frederick Lucas Cook, 2nd Baronet (21 November 1844 – 21 May 1920) was the second holder of the Cook Baronetcy, the head of the family textile-trading company, and a Conservative Party politician.

== Life ==
The son of Sir Francis Cook, 1st Bt and Emily Martha Lucas, he was educated at Harrow School, succeeded to his father's titles in 1901 and was married on 7 January 1868 to Mary Anne Elizabeth Cotton, daughter of Richard Payne Cotton. He was succeeded in his titles by his only son Herbert.

He was elected at the 1895 general election as Member of Parliament (MP) for the Kennington division of Lambeth in South London, and held the seat until his defeat at the 1906 general election. He was also a deputy lieutenant of the City of London.

Cook is buried in Richmond Cemetery.

Parliament of the United Kingdom
Preceded by Mark Hanbury Beaufoy	Member of Parliament for Kennington; 1895 – 1906	Succeeded by Stephen Collins
Baronetage of the United Kingdom
Preceded by Francis Cook	Baronet (of Doughty House); 1901 – 1920	Succeeded by Herbert Cook
