= Madonna and Child (Cima, private collection) =

Painting by Cima da Conegliano

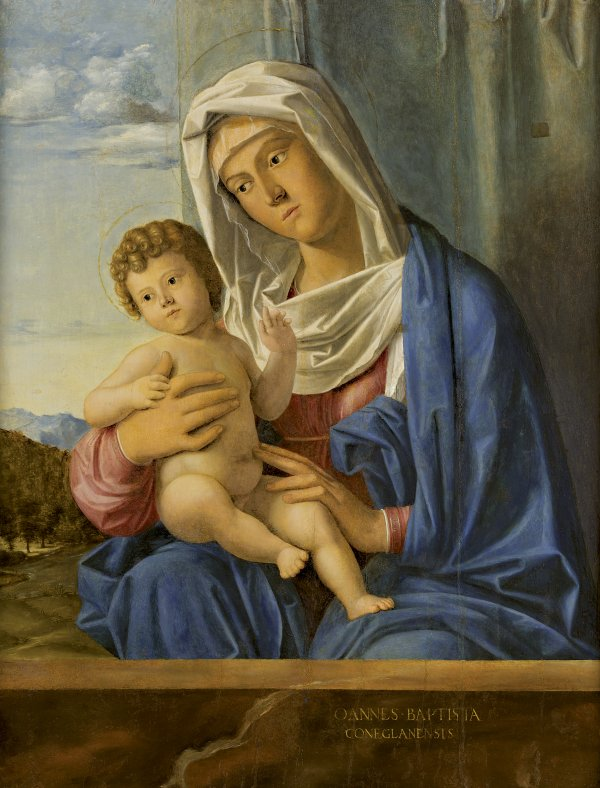
Madonna and Child (1504) by Cima da Conegliano

Madonna and Child is a 1504 oil on panel painting by Cima da Conegliano, now in a private collection. It was last sold at Christie's in London on 25 November 1966 as part of a sale of works from Sir Herbert Cook's collection and is therefore sometimes known as the Cook Madonna, not to be confused with another painting of that name by Crivelli now known to be the central panel of the Porto San Giorgio Altarpiece.

== Bibliography ==
- Bernard Berenson, The Venetian Painters of the Renaissance, New York, 1897, p. 98;
- (in German) Rudolf F. Burckhardt, Cima da Conegliano, ein Veneziani-scher maler des Übergangs vom Quattrocento zum Cin-quecento, Berlino, 1904, p. 117;
- Bernard Berenson, Italian Pictures of the Renaissance: a Listof the Principal Artists and their Works with an Index of Places, Oxford, 1932, vol. I, p. 67;
- (in Italian) Bernard Berenson, Metodo e attribuzioni, Firenze, 1947, p. 125;
- (in Italian) Luigi Coletti, Cima da Conegliano, Venezia, 1959, tav. 93;
- Peter Humfrey, Cima da Conegliano, Cambridge, 1983, p. 170, n. 176, tav. 40.
