= Homer, Ohio =

- Unincorporated community
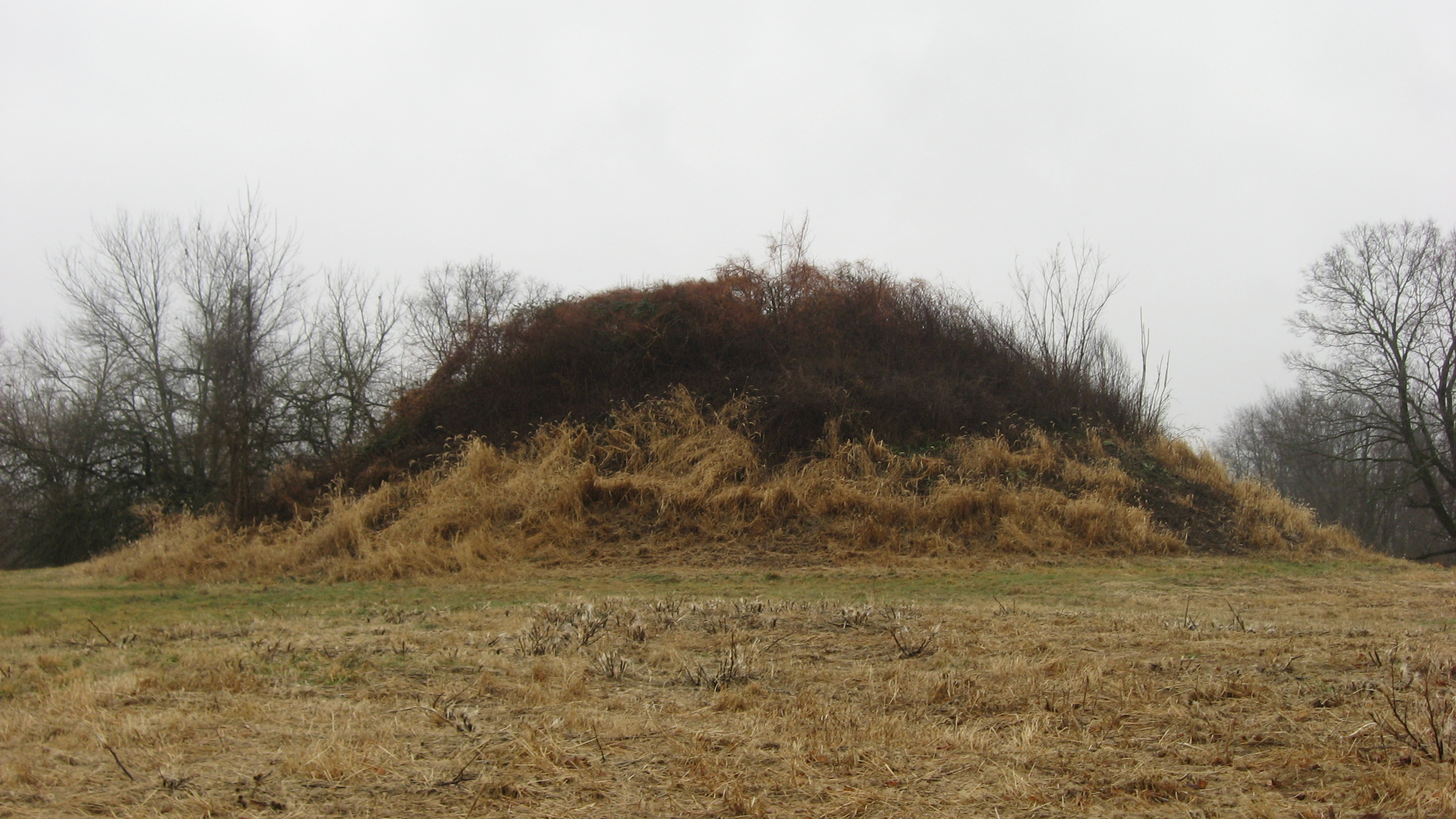
- Dixon Mound, built by the Adena culture, on the community's western side

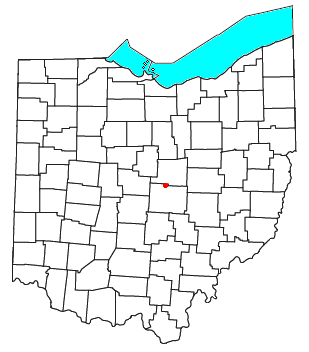
- Location in Licking County

- Location within Ohio Location within the United States
- Coordinates: 40.2528414°N 82.5176626°W
- Country: United States
- State: Ohio
- County: Licking
- Elevation: 991 ft (302 m)
- Time zone: UTC−5 (Eastern (EST))
  - Summer (DST): UTC−4 (EDT)
- ZIP code: 43027
- GNIS feature ID: 1064854

Homer is an unincorporated community in northern Burlington Township, Licking County, Ohio, United States. It lies along State Route 661 between Granville and Mount Vernon.

== History ==
Homer was laid out in 1816. The community was named after Homer, an ancient Greek poet. A post office called Homer has been in operation since 1831.

== Notable people ==
- Tennessee Claflin (born 1844), suffragist and first woman to open a Wall Street brokerage firm
- Victoria Woodhull (born 1838), suffragist and first female candidate for President of the United States.
