= Cook, Son & Co. =

Cook, Son & Co. was one of the largest English wholesale clothing traders and drapers of the late 19th century and early 20th century.

The firm was created by William Cook in 1819. In 1822 he went into partnership with his brother James and in 1825 with Mr Gladstones. The firm moved to St Paul's Church Yard in 1834.

William died in 1869. His son, Francis Cook, was head of the firm until his death in 1901. The company continued as a family business.

The company concentrated on warehousing and distribution rather than manufacturing. It employed Commercial travellers who exploited the recently built railway network to make sales by visiting retailers with samples of the products.
