= The Triumph of Flora (Poussin) =

Painting by Nicolas Poussin

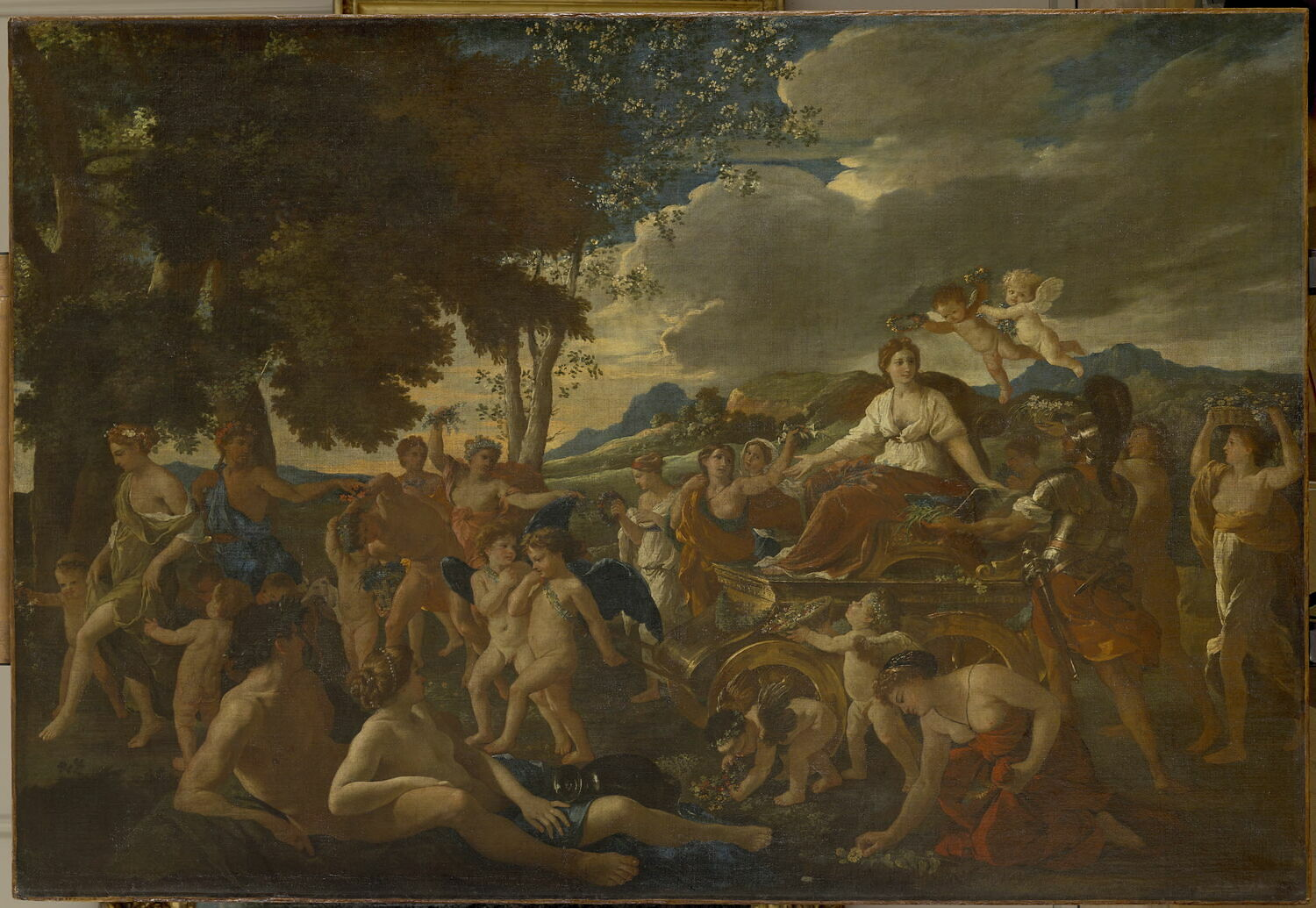
The Triumph of Flora, 1.65 x 2.41 m

The Triumph of Flora (French: Le Triomphe de Flore) is an oil painting by Nicolas Poussin, dated to about 1627 or 1628, which is now in the Louvre in Paris.

The nymph Chloris, honoured by the Greeks; and afterwards by the Romans as Flora, the goddess of flowers and gardens, was a natural subject for Poussin, who was a great admirer of the ancient religious rites.

== Description ==
The picture exhibits the goddess seated in a splendid car drawn by two winged boys, accompanied by a numerous train of nymphs, youths, and cupids, most of whom have flowers either in baskets or in their hands; her attention is directed to Mars, who stands at the side of her car, acknowledging her sovereignty as she passes. Among her attendants may be noticed a youth performing antics: in advance of him two nymphs dancing, and scattering flowers which others are gathering; and above are two cupids, one of whom is placing a chaplet on her head. Close to the front are a fine formed man naked and recumbent on some drapery, and a female reclining on his lap.

Smith (1837) lamented its poor state of preservation. "Of this once excellent picture, little of its original beauty remains; the brown ground on which it was painted having destroyed all the delicate tints, and made others so obscure as to be nearly black."

Engraved by Audran, Niquet and Fessard.

== Bibliography ==
- Smith, John (1837). A Catalogue Raisonné of the Works of the Most Eminent Dutch, Flemish and French Painters: Nicholas Poussin, Claude Lorraine, and Jean Baptist Greuze. Vol. 8. London: Smith and Son. pp. 126 (no. 243), 135 (no. 269).
