= Cook baronets of Brome Hall (1663) =

Escutcheon of the Cook baronets of Brome Hall

The Cook baronetcy of Brome Hall was created on 29 June 1663 for William Cook of Norfolk. The 2nd Baronet was Member of Parliament for Great Yarmouth from 1685 to 1687, and for Norfolk from 1689 to 1695, and from 1698 to 1700.

== Cook baronets, of Brome Hall (1663) ==
- Sir William Cook, 1st Baronet (c.1600–1681)
- Sir William Cook, 2nd Baronet (c.1630–1708), son of the former, succeeded 1681. He had seven daughters with his wife Jane Steward, but left no heir to the title.

== Extended family ==
The 2nd Baronet's daughter Elizabeth married in 1698 Thornhagh Gurdon.
