= Doughty House =

Mansion in London, England

Coordinates: 51°27′07″N 0°17′53″W

- Interactive map of the Doughty House area

General information
- Type: Residential
- Location: Richmond Hill, Richmond upon Thames, London, England

Listed Building – Grade II
- Official name: Downe House/ The Gallery at Number 142 Doughty House
- Designated: 17 May 1999
- Reference no.: 1249955 (house); 1387232 (gallery)

Doughty House is a large house on Richmond Hill in Richmond, London, England, built in the 18th century, with later additions. It has fine views down over the Thames, and both the house and gallery are Grade II listed buildings. This view from Richmond Hill is the only view in England protected by an Act of Parliament.

The house was named after Elizabeth Doughty, who lived there from about 1786 and provided funds to build St Elizabeth of Portugal Church in The Vineyard, Richmond. It was the residence of the Cook baronets from when it was bought in 1849 by Francis Cook, 1st Viscount of Monserrate, and passed in his family by descent until after World War II. A 125-foot-long gallery (38 m) was added in 1885 for his very important art collection. The first Lady Cook, the American suffragist Tennessee Claflin, was mistress of Doughty House from 1885 until her death. In 1870, she became the first woman, along with her sister Victoria Woodhull, to open a Wall Street brokerage firm.

The house and its collection became famous when the 3rd baronet Herbert Cook wrote his catalogue of the collection in 1914, for which he commissioned art historians to help with the various schools. It was his intention to keep the collection together, but financial difficulties in the 1930s forced him to consider selling and negotiations were opened with dealers before he died in 1939. The house was damaged by bombing in the Second World War and the 4th baronet, Sir Francis Cook, who was an artist himself, moved to Jersey with 30 paintings from the collection.

Doughty House was sold in 2013 to the developer K10 Group Ltd., which is working on a £30 million renovation to transform the structure into a private residence.

== Doughty House in art ==
Awaiting the Arrival of Christopher at Doughty House, Richmond: Bishop and George Bellamy, March 1938 (1938) and Airing Curtains, The Garden, Doughty House, Richmond (1946) by Francis Ferdinand Maurice Cook (1907–78) are held at the Sir Francis Cook Gallery, Jersey, in the Channel Islands.

== See also ==
- Cook baronets
- Alfred Ernest Allnatt
