= Francis Cook, 1st Viscount of Monserrate =

British merchant and art collector

Sir Francis Cook
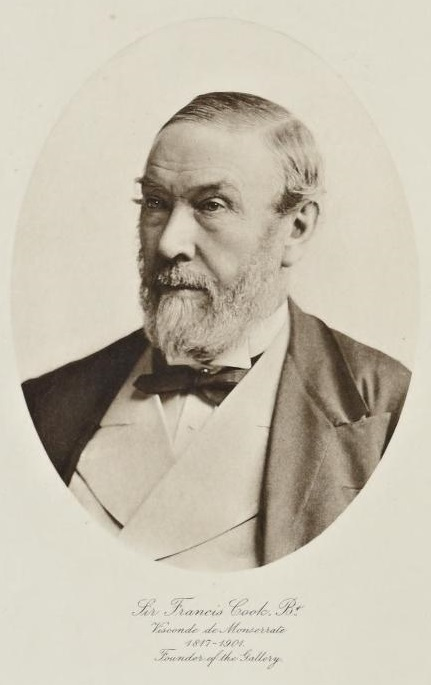
- Born: Francis Cook; 23 January 1817; Clapham, London
- Died: 17 February 1901 (aged 84); Richmond, London
- Resting place: West Norwood Cemetery, West Norwood, England
- Title: 1st Viscount of Monserrate; 1st Cook Baronet
- Spouses: Emily Martha Lucas (m. 1841; died 1884) Tennessee Celeste Claflin (m. 1885)
- Children: Sir Frederick Cook, 2nd Baronet
- Parent(s): William Cook; Mary Ann Lainson

Sir Francis Cook, 1st Baronet, 1st Viscount Monserrate (23 January 1817 – 17 February 1901) was a British merchant and art collector.

== Early life ==
Cook was born on 23 January 1817 in Clapham, London. He was the son of William Cook and Mary Ann (née Lainson) Cook.

== Career ==
In 1833, he entered his father's firm Cook, Son & Co. based in the City of London, which traded finished wool, cotton, linen and silk, after travels in Europe and the Near East. From 1869, he was its head, rising to be one of Britain's three richest men.

He was created 1st Visconde de Monserrate, Sintra, Portugal, and on 10 March 1886, he was created 1st Baronet Cook, of Doughty House, Richmond, Surrey.

=== Collections ===
In 1849, he bought Doughty House in Richmond and in 1855 the quinta of Monserrate in Sintra, Portugal. There, he restored Monserrate Palace, a Moorish-style palace, and became visconde de Monserrate (Viscount of Monserrate).

He began to collect classical sculpture in the late 1850s. He collected his first major paintings in 1868, at which date Sir John Charles Robinson (1824–1913), former Victoria and Albert Museum curator, became his advisor. He had 510 major works by 1876 and in 1885 added a Long Gallery to Doughty House to accommodate the growing collection, making this gallery open to scholars. His collection was left, in trust, to his eldest son and his heirs.

In 2017 a painting attributed to Leonardo da Vinci entitled Salvator Mundi was sold for $450 million by the auction house Christie's to Saudi Prince Badr bin Abdullah bin Mohammed Al Farhan. This painting, bought by Francis Cook in 1900, was sold in June 1958 by Sotheby's for only £45 since the family was of the belief that the artist was Giovanni Antonio Boltraffio, a contemporary and studio mate of Leonardo.

== Personal life ==
On 1 August 1841, he married Emily Martha Lucas, the daughter of Robert Lucas. Together, they were the parents of:

- Frederick Cook (1844–1920), who married Mary Anne Elizabeth Cotton (d. 1913), daughter of Richard Payne Cotton.
- Emily Jane Cook (1849–1915), who married Maj.Gen. Sir Euston Henry Sartorius (1844–1925), the son of Admiral of the Fleet Sir George Rose Sartorius, in 1874.
- Wyndam Francis Cook (1860–1905), who married Frederica Evelyn Stillwell Freeland (d. 1925) in 1887.

Emily died on 12 August 1884. On 1 October 1885, he married for the second time to the American feminist stockbroker, and former clairvoyant, Tennessee Celeste Claflin (1844–1923). She was the daughter of Reuben-Buckman Claflin and had set up her own firm with help from Cornelius Vanderbilt. Her sister, Victoria Woodhull, was the first woman to run for the American presidency.

He died on 17 February 1901, leaving an estate of £1,600,000, and was buried at West Norwood Cemetery. He was succeeded by his son Frederick. His widow, Lady Cook, died in 1923.

== Works collected by him ==
- Three Marys at the Sepulchre, by Hubert van Eyck (Museum Boijmans van Beuningen, Rotterdam)
- Old Woman Cooking Eggs, by Diego Velázquez (National Gallery of Scotland, Edinburgh)
- Christ at the Column, by Antonello da Messina (Musée du Louvre, Paris)
- Portrait of a lady, by François Clouet (National Gallery of Art, Washington DC)
- Woman at her toilet, by Metsu (Norton Simon Foundation, Pasadena, CA).
- Statuette of Mercury (Metropolitan Museum of Art, New York, NY)

Baronetage of the United Kingdom
New creation	Baronet (of Doughty House); 1886 – 1901	Succeeded by Frederick Cook
