= Cook baronets =

Set index for Cook baronets

There have been baronetcies for the surname Cook, one in the Baronetage of England and the other in the Baronetage of the United Kingdom. As of 2026 the latter is extant.

- Cook baronets of Brome Hall (1663)
- Cook baronets of Doughty House (1886)
