= Currency Building =

19th-century building in Kolkata, India

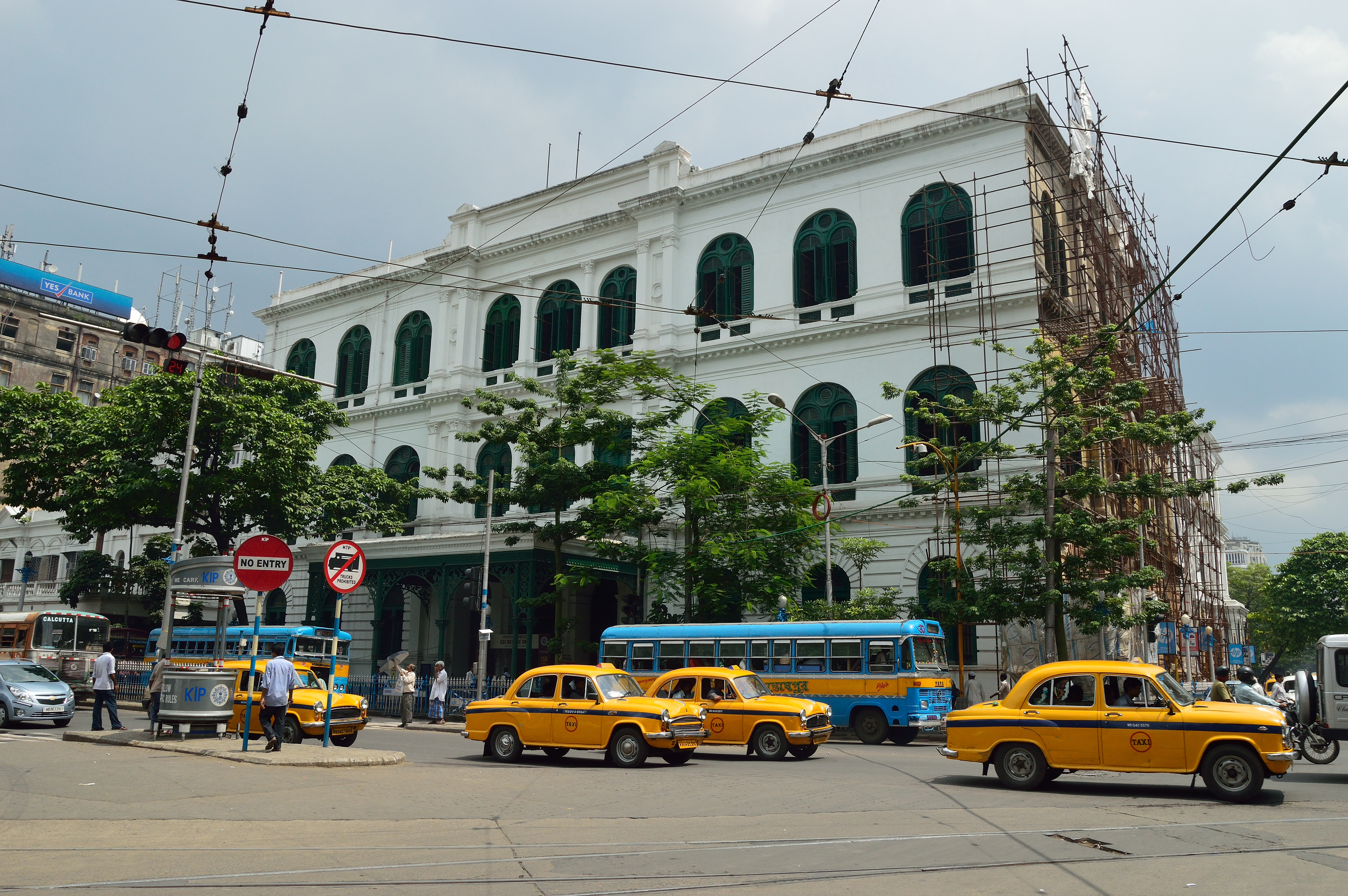
- Currency Building, viewed from B. B. D. Bagh (formerly the 'Dalhousie Square')
- Former name: Agra Bank; Agra and Masterman's Bank; Currency Office; Reserve Bank of India; Old Currency Building
- Established: 1833 (built); 1868 (Currency Office conversion); 2020 (post-renovation dedication)
- Location: Old Court House Road and Surendra Mohan Ghosh Sarani, Lal Dighi, B. B. D. Bagh (Dalhousie Square), Kolkata, West Bengal, India
- Coordinates: 22°34′14″N 88°21′01″E
- Type: Museum
- Curators: DAG Museums; National Gallery of Modern Art (NGMA)
- Public transit access: Mahakaran; B. B. D. Bagh

The Currency Building is an early 19th-century building in the B. B. D. Bagh (Dalhousie Square) central business district of Kolkata in West Bengal, India. The building was originally built in 1833 to house the Calcutta branch of the Agra Bank. In 1868, it was converted for use by the Office of the Issue and Exchange of Government Currency, an office of the Controller of the Currency under the British Raj. From 1935 until 1937, the Reserve Bank of India (RBI) used the building as its first central office. The building remained in use, and was used at one time by the Central Public Works Department (CPWD) as a storehouse. Authorities decided to demolish it in 1994.

From 1996 to 1998, the CPWD undertook demolition; but the building was saved from being completely demolished by the Indian National Trust for Art and Cultural Heritage (INTACH) and the Kolkata Municipal Corporation. In 2003, custodianship passed to the Archaeological Survey of India (ASI), which renovated the building from 2005 to 2019. On 11 January 2020, Prime Minister Narendra Modi formally dedicated and reopened it as a museum.

The Currency Building is a three-story Italianate structure, consisting of floors covered by marble and Chunar sandstone. Its main entrance features a three-part gate made of wrought iron and Venetian windows. The building's central hall, now an open-air courtyard, was formerly topped by three large domes with skylights. During its use as a currency office, the central hall contained the exchange counters for banknotes, gold, silver, and small change. During the building's renovation, the central hall was reorganized into a space for open-air programmes.

== Geography and setting ==
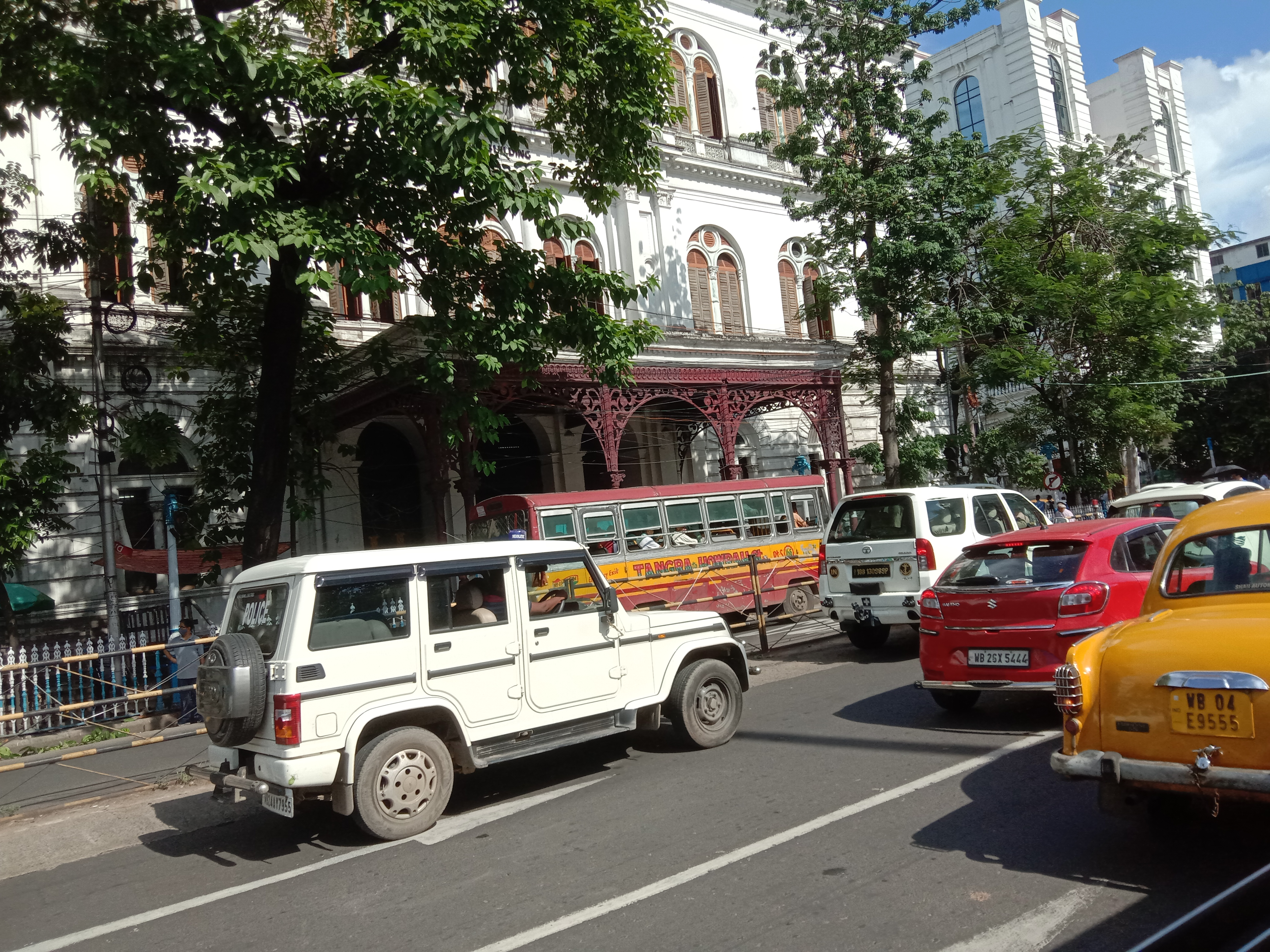
Vehicles in front of the Currency Building main entrance at B. B. D. Bag, June 2022.

The Currency Building is located at 11B on B. B. D. Bagh (which is Kolkata's central business district, formerly known as Dalhousie Square), at the intersection of Old Court House Road and Surendra Mohan Ghosh Sarani. The building's main façade faces west toward B. B. D. Bagh. The Lal Dighi water tank is located approximately 100 metres (330 ft) northwest of the building, the Mahakaran metro station on Green Line and the B. B. D. Bagh Tram Station are immediately west, and the Hooghly River is approximately 660 metres (2,170 ft) west.

== History ==
=== Bank headquarters and currency office ===
Calcutta served as the capital of the British Raj from the 18th century until 1911, when New Delhi became the capital. During Calcutta's tenure as capital, Dalhousie Square was the city’s financial, social, and political center. The plot in Dalhousie Square, on which the Currency Building now stands, was originally the site of the Calcutta Auction Company's office building. In 1825, the Agra Bank (Note: The Agra Bank was established in 1833. The Agra Bank became the Agra and United Service Bank, Limited, in 1862, and it subsequently merged with Masterman, Peters, Mildred, Birkbeck and Company, in 1864, and became the Agra and Masterman's Bank, Limited. Agra and Masterman's Bank ceased operation in June 1866, and in December 1866, all "property and effects" of the bank were transferred to Agra Bank, Limited, which was reincorporated in 1867. Agra Bank, Limited, continued operation until its liquidation in 1900.) acquired the plot, constructing, in 1833, during William Bentinck's tenure as governor general, the present-day building to house its Calcutta branch. The Agra Bank ceased operation in 1866. (Note: While sources differ on the year of the Agra Bank's failure (1866 or 1886) and on the year of the Currency Department's acquisition of the Currency Building (1868, 1886, or 1888), the Reserve Bank of India, the Court of Chancery, and statistician John Biddulph Martin state that the Agra Bank failed in 1866.)

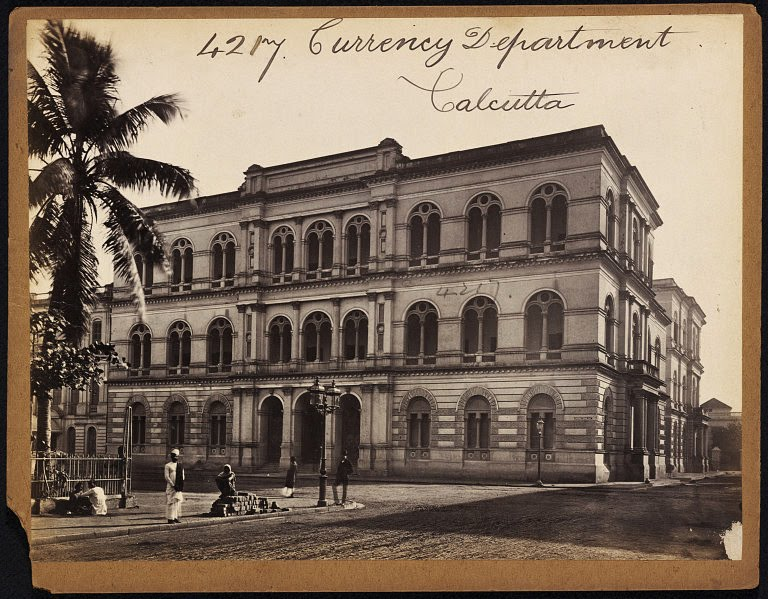
Currency Building, while occupied by the Currency Department

In 1868, the imperial Controller of the Currency converted a large portion of the Currency Building for use by the Office of the Issue and Exchange of Government Currency, after which it became known as the Currency Building. The Calcutta Mint sent silver coins to the currency office, to maintain a working reserve of currency, while the bulk of India's silver was held in Fort William. In addition to issuing and storing coinage, the Indian government also utilized the building for the issue of paper currency. Between 1889 and 1890, the Bengal government improved the building's drainage, as part of its maintenance of Calcutta's civil buildings.

Following the establishment of the Reserve Bank of India (RBI) on 1 April 1935, the Currency Building served as RBI's first central office from 1935 to 1937. The RBI was established to regulate the issuance of banknotes, maintain reserves to secure monetary stability, and operate India's currency and credit systems. In 1937, the RBI relocated its central office from the Currency Building to Bombay. From 1937 to 1994, the building remained in use, but it suffered neglect. At one point it was used by the CPWD as a storehouse.

=== Renovation ===
In 1994, authorities decided to raze the Currency Building due to structural deterioration; and custodianship passed to the CPWD, which planned to build a high-rise building in its place. In 1996, the CPWD commenced the building's demolition. The department had demolished the building's three large domes over the central hall before the Indian National Trust for Art and Cultural Heritage (INTACH) and the Kolkata Municipal Corporation intervened and halted demolition in 1998. Custodianship passed to the Archaeological Survey of India (ASI) in 2003 and they took possession of the building in 2005.

In 2004 and 2006, the World Monuments Fund included the historic buildings of Dalhousie Square on its World Monuments Watch to garner funding and support for local conservationists to preserve the square's buildings. Propelled by this watch-listing, the Government of West Bengal promised to preserve the district's buildings. In 2009, the Kolkata Municipal Corporation approved a graded list of historic landmarks, which listed the Currency Building as a Grade I heritage building.

ASI was entrusted with the Currency Building's conservation and restoration, which was led by a technical team of engineers and archaeologists. It took two years to remove demolition debris and then commence the building's restoration by repairing and reconstructing the demolished portions around the building's central hall. The project was delayed due to a shortage of workers skilled in lime plastering. By 2019, ASI had an exhibition space and bookshop in the Currency Building.

=== Museum and event space ===
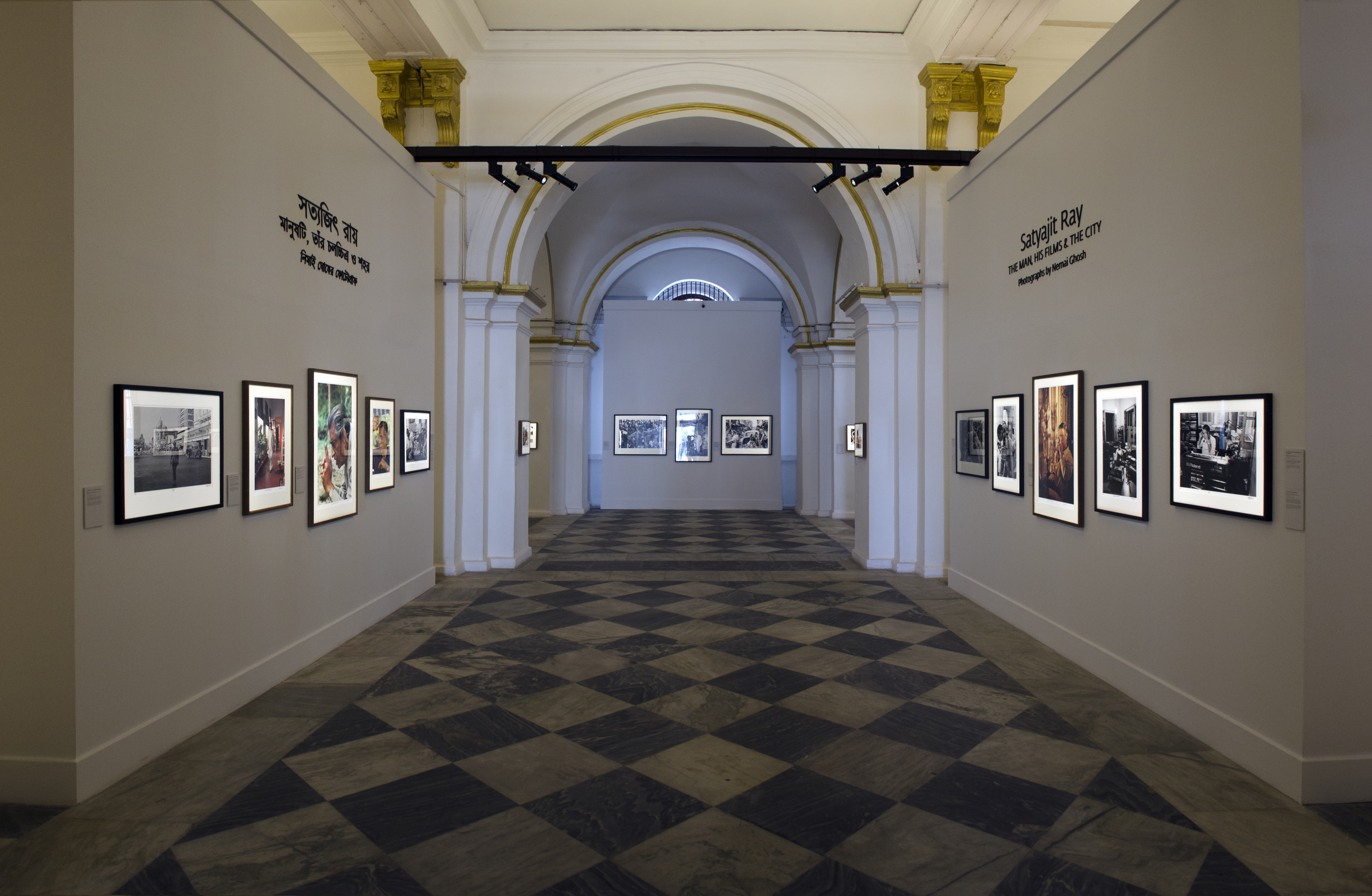
Photographs of Satyajit Ray by Nemai Ghosh

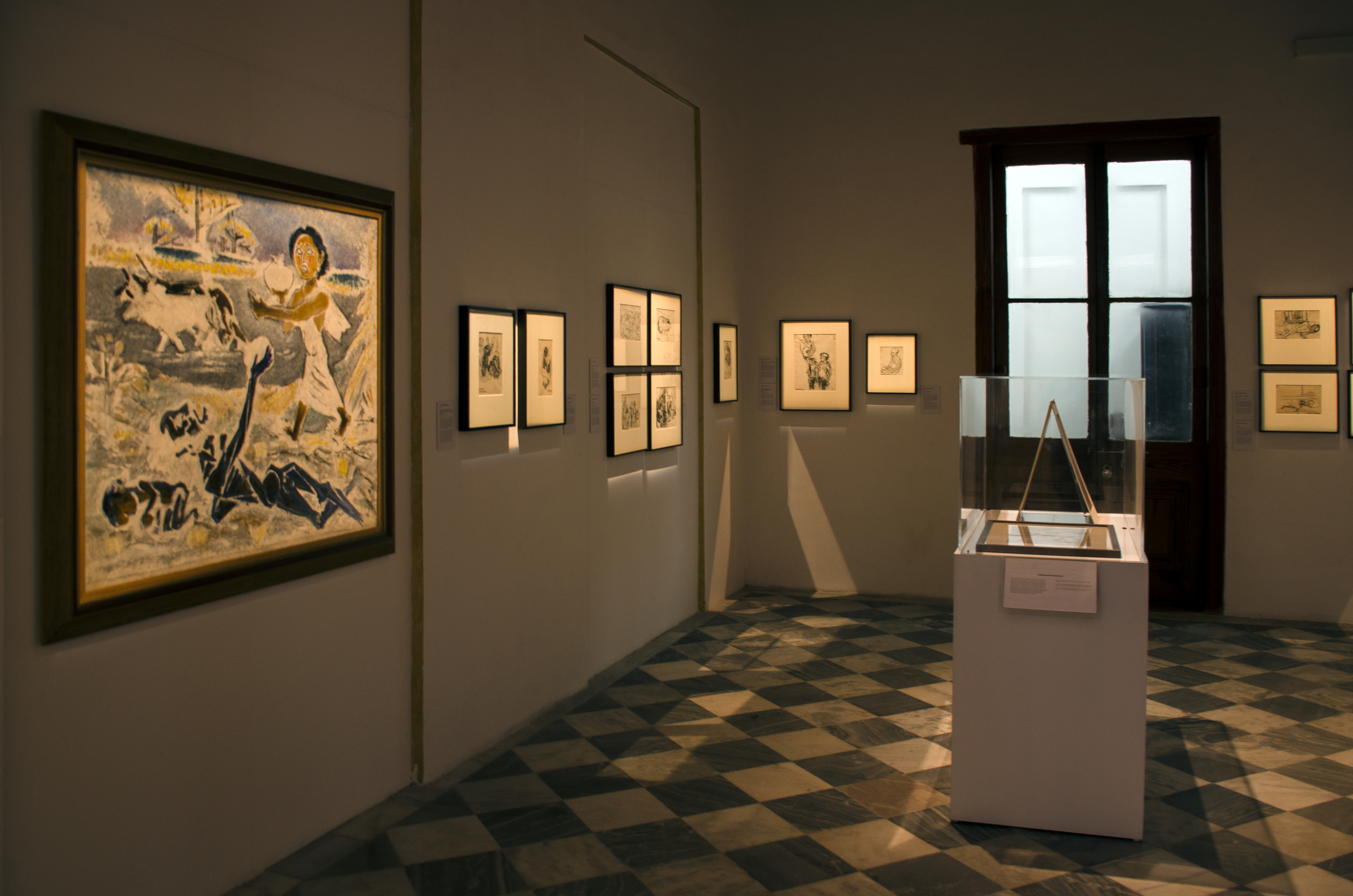
Interior exhibition space

Following the building's restoration, the Currency Building hosted a jute and silk exhibition organized by India's National Jute Board in 2019. On 11 January 2020, Prime Minister of India Narendra Modi formally dedicated the Currency Building as a public museum to the nation at its reopening ceremony. It was one of four restored colonial buildings in Kolkata to be dedicated by Modi, along with Metcalfe Hall, Belvedere House, and the Victoria Memorial.

The building's reopening marked the start of its inaugural art exhibition, Ghare Baire | The World, The Home and Beyond: 18th-20th Century Art in Bengal, which opened on 12 January 2020. The exhibition was commissioned by India's Ministry of Culture, and was organised and curated by DAG Museums—a private art curation and education organisation—in collaboration with the National Gallery of Modern Art (NGMA). According to DAG, the exhibition was "the first comprehensive showcasing of the art and artists of Bengal". Entry to the exhibition is free. The museum and exhibition were briefly closed due to the Coronavirus Disease 2019 (COVID-19) pandemic. In February 2021, two works of Abdur Rahman Chughtai, considered Pakistan's national artist, were displayed for the first time at the Currency Building as part of the Ghare Baire exhibit. In January 2021, the Currency Building also served as an event space for talks given as part of the Apeejay Kolkata Literary Festival 2021.

== Architecture ==
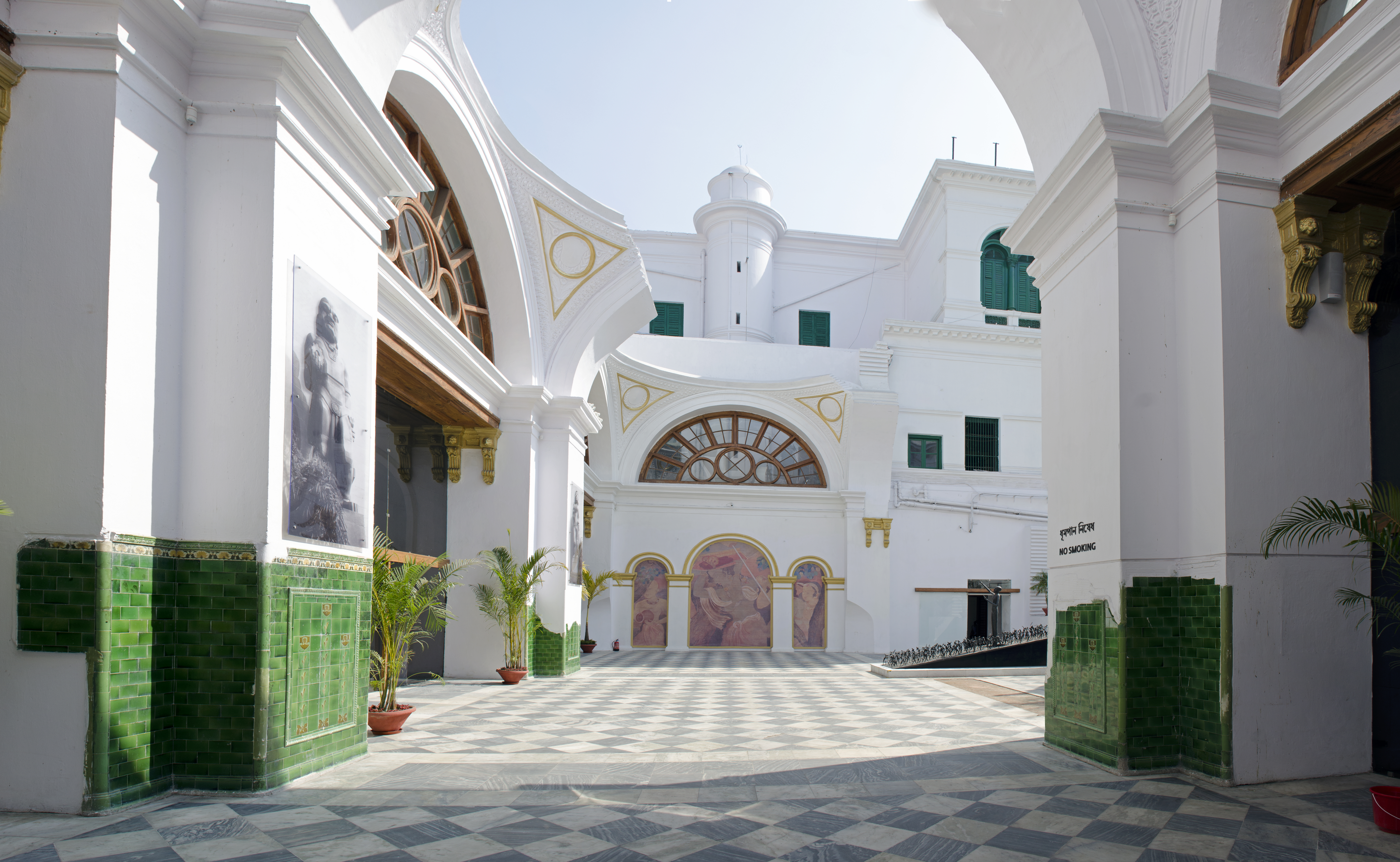
Open-air central hall

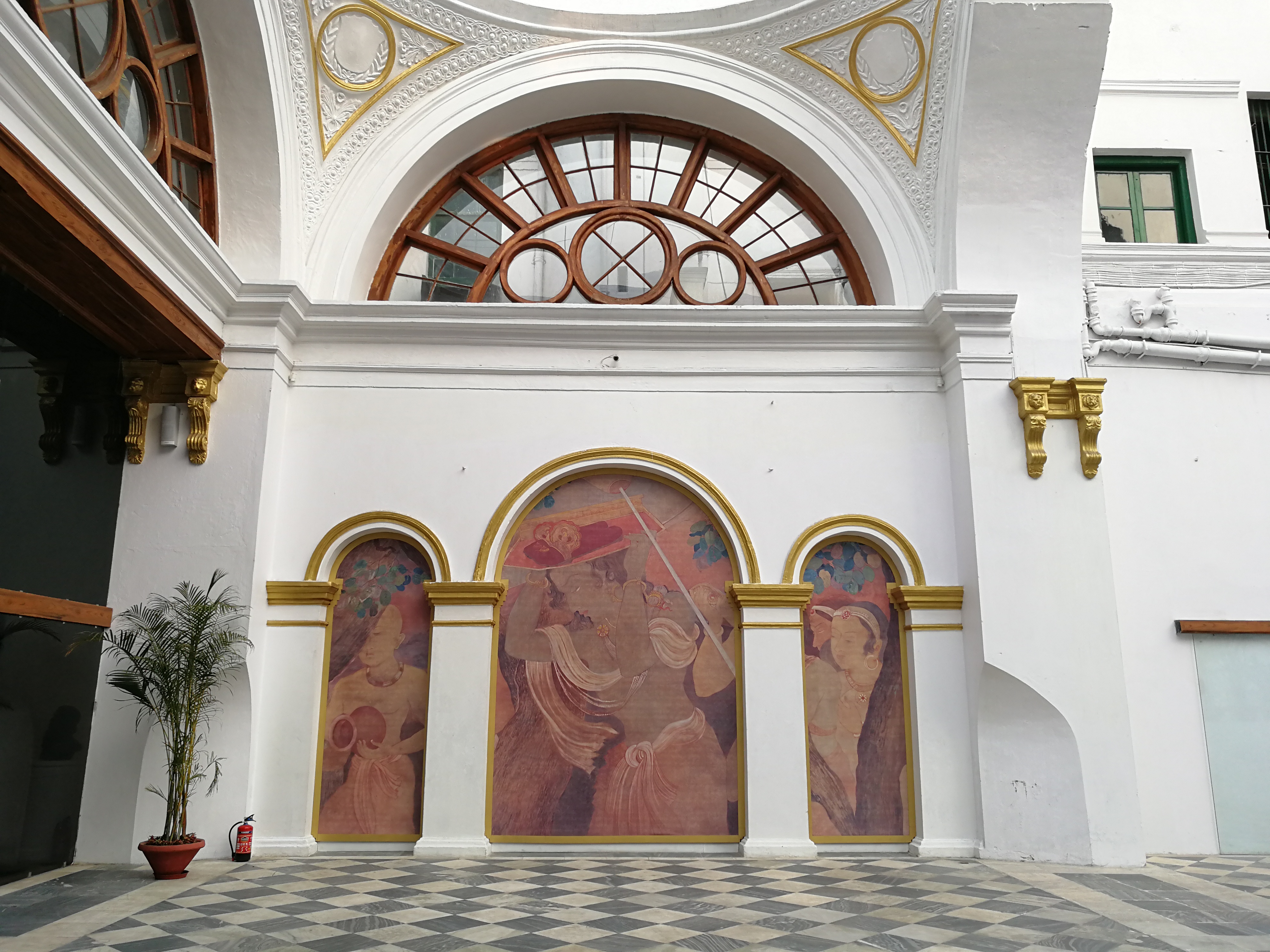
Mural in the Central Hall

The Currency Building is a three-story brick structure, built in the Italianate style of architecture. The building's arched roof is supported by iron joists. Its floors are covered by marble and Chunar sandstone. The main entrance, in the west-façade, features a three-part gate made of wrought iron, and Venetian windows. The building's central hall, now an open-air courtyard, was formerly topped by three large domes with skylights. During the building's use as a currency office, the central hall contained the exchange counters for banknotes, gold, silver, and small change. The second floor contained large, elaborately finished rooms with Italian marble floors. The third floor also featured Italian marble floors, and housed the residence of the assistant commissioner in charge of the currency office.

The initial plan during renovation was to construct a glass roof over the central hall where the three domes were formerly located; however, ASI cancelled this plan and reorganized the central hall into a space for open-air programmes. ASI installed motion-sensor-equipped glass doors to provide access between the central hall and adjacent interior corridors; polished the windows and doors in the western wing; repainted the exterior façade white; plastered the interior walls; repaired floors; restored decaying wooden staircases; and overhauled the drainage system to mitigate seepage from the drainage lines of adjacent buildings. During this project, ASI archaeologists uncovered evidence of an underground canal from the nearby Hooghly River, the water from which was used to cool newly minted coins.

== Bibliography ==
- Administration of Bengal (1890). Report of the Administration of Bengal, 1889–90. Calcutta: The Bengal Secretariat Press – via Internet Archive.
- Cotton, H. E. A. (1980). Ray, N. A. (ed.). Calcutta Old and New: A Historical and Descriptive Handbook to the City. Calcutta: B. Sinha – via Internet Archive.
- Hemming, G. W., ed. (1870). The Law Reports: Equity Cases, Including Bankruptcy Cases, Before The Master of the Rolls, the Vice-Chancellors, and the Chief Judge in Bankruptcy. Vol. IX. London: William Clowes and Sons, Printed for the Council of Law Reporting. Archived from the original on 31 December 2020 – via Google Books.
- Jones, Geoffrey (1995). British Multinational Banking, 1830–1990. Oxford: Clarendon Press. ISBN 9780198206026. Archived from the original on 31 December 2020 – via Google Books.
- Kolkata Municipal Corporation (2009). Capacity Building Programme: Graded List of Heritage Buildings (PDF). Vol. XI. Kolkata: Kolkata Municipal Corporation. Archived (PDF) from the original on 22 December 2015.
- Lonely Planet (2019). Lonely Planet India. Franklin, Tennessee: Lonely Planet. ISBN 9781788686822. Archived from the original on 3 April 2021 – via Google Books.
- Mäkitie, Ilkka (July 2016). "British Circular Notes – a listing with illustrations". International Bank Note Society Journal. 55 (3): 30–38 – via Internet Archive.
- Martin, John Biddulph (September 1879). "On Some Effects of a Crisis on the Banking Interest". Journal of the Statistical Society of London. 42 (3): 663–708. doi:10.2307/2339053. JSTOR 2339053.
- Suhrawardy, Hassan (1936). Calcutta and Environs. Calcutta – via Internet Archive.
