= Woodhull & Claflin's Weekly =

American weekly newspaper

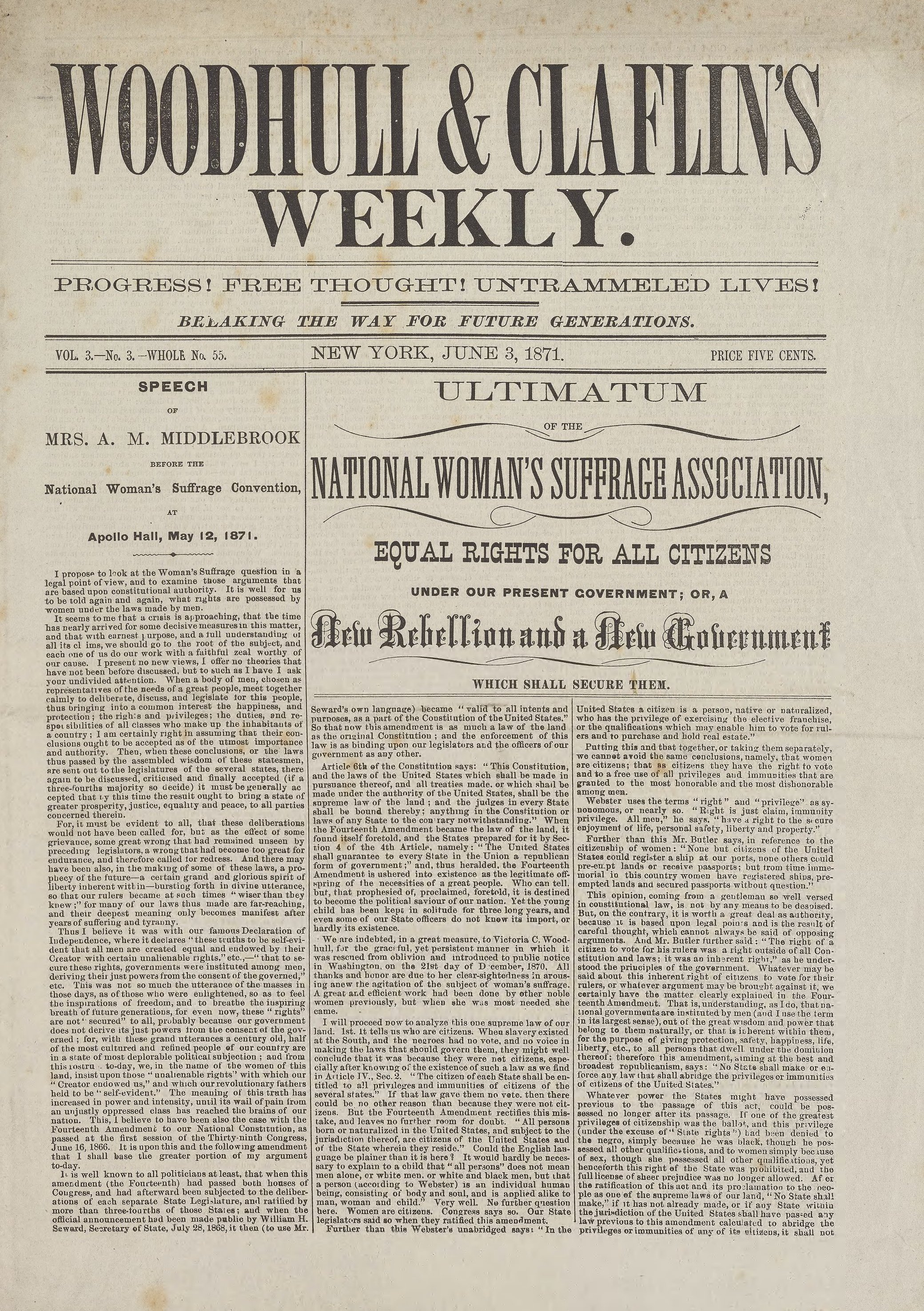
June 3, 1871 edition

Woodhull & Claflin's Weekly was an American weekly newspaper first published on May 14, 1870, by sisters Victoria Woodhull and Tennessee Claflin. It was among the first publications to be published by women. It lasted until June 10, 1876.

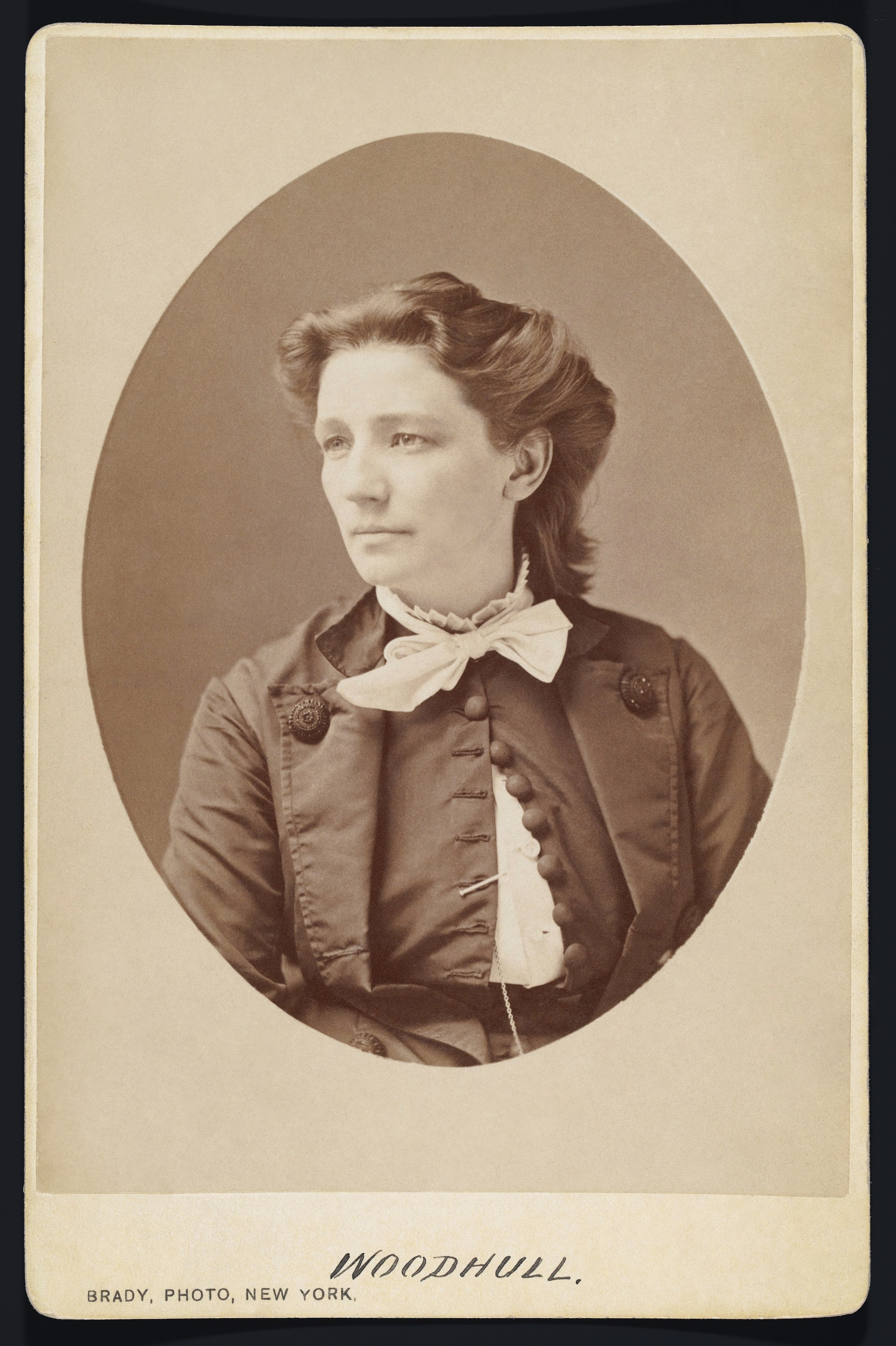
Victoria Woodhull

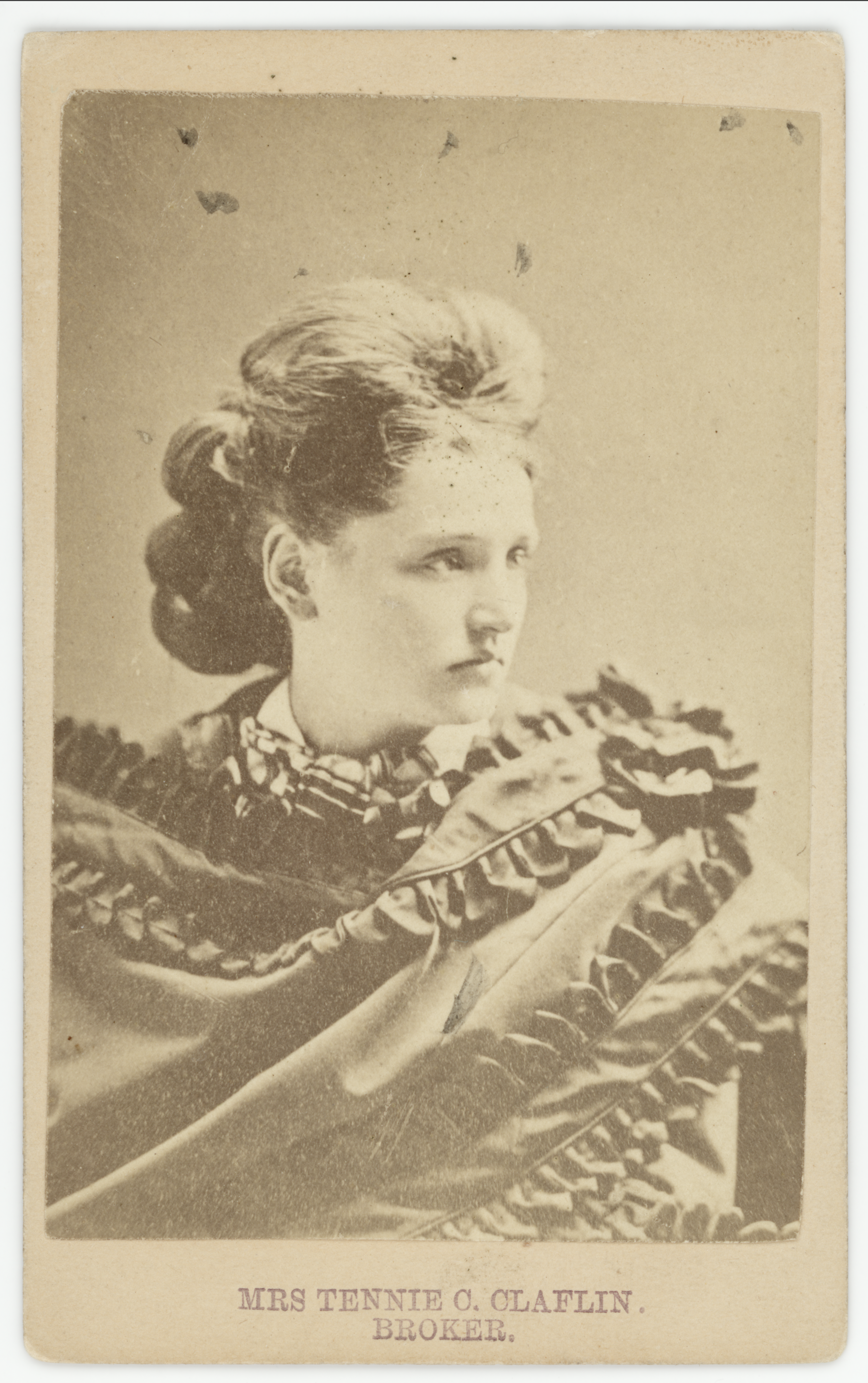
Tennessee Claflin

== History ==
Following the success of Woodhull and Claflin's stock brokerage, the sisters founded Woodhull & Claflin's Weekly using funds from that endeavor. After the weekly's scandals in 1872, landlords refused to rent and the publication briefly ceased circulation. At its height, the publication had national circulation of 20,000.

== Content ==
The Weekly published a variety of articles on such topics as women's suffrage, spiritualism, vegetarianism, free love, and socialism. Most content was written by Woodhull, Claflin, Colonel James Harvey Blood, and Stephen Pearl Andrews.

The publication initially carried four pages of advertising, but by 1872, advertisers began dropping off despite threats. The Weekly also blackmailed celebrities and politicians, justifying the articles by saying women must protect themselves if laws and the justice system wouldn't.

Throughout its run, the publication chiefly promoted Woodhull's political and reform ambitions, making it the primary propaganda vehicle for Woodhull when she ran for president in 1872.

On December 30, 1871, the Weekly was the first in the United States to publish Karl Marx and Frederich Engels's The Communist Manifesto, in English. Woodhull and Claflin felt that the document was important in the context of the progress that the International Workingman's Association was making at the time.

=== Henry Ward Beecher scandal ===
On November 2, 1872, Woodhull & Claflin's Weekly published a story featuring Henry Ward Beecher's affair with Theodore Tilton's wife, Elizabeth Richards Tilton. The article made detailed allegations that America's most renowned clergyman was secretly practicing the free-love doctrines that he denounced from the pulpit. The story created a national sensation, and issues were said to have changed hands at 40 dollars apiece. Later that day, Woodhull, Claflin and Col. Blood were arrested and charged with publishing an obscene newspaper and circulating it through the United States Postal Service. In the raid, 3,000 copies of the newspaper were found. It was this arrest and Woodhull's acquittal that propelled Congress to pass the 1873 Comstock Laws. On May 17, 1873, the entire Beecher article was reprinted.

In 1874, Woodhull, Claflin and Col. Blood were brought to court again and sued for libel against Luther C. Challis who was also featured in the same issue. The wealthy broker who knew the women when they were on Wall Street was accused of seducing two young girls. The trial lasted ten days and the trio were found not guilty by the jury.
