= Victoria Woodhull =

American women's suffrage activist (1838–1927)

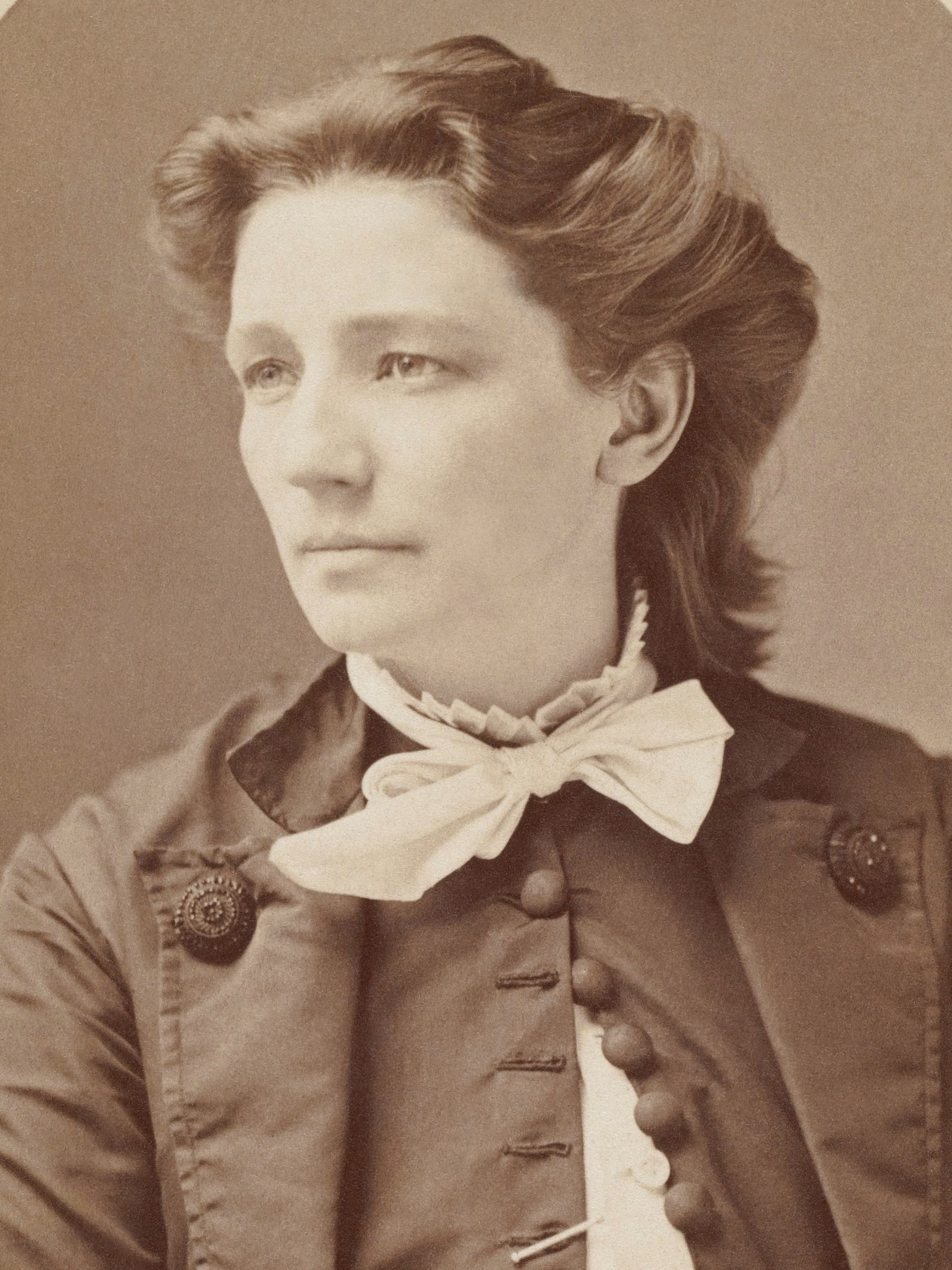
- Photograph by Mathew Brady, c. 1870
- Born: Victoria California Claflin; September 23, 1838; Homer, Ohio, U.S.
- Died: June 9, 1927 (aged 88); Bredon's Norton, Worcestershire, England
- Occupations: Suffragist; politician; feminist; writer
- Known for: Politics; women's rights; women's suffrage; feminism; civil rights; anti-slavery; stockbroker; journalism; free love
- Political party: Equal Rights
- Spouses: Canning Woodhull (m. 1853; div. 1865) James Blood (m. 1865; div. 1876) John Biddulph Martin (m. 1883; died 1897)
- Children: 2
- Relatives: Tennessee Claflin (sister)

Victoria Claflin Woodhull (born Victoria California Claflin; September 23, 1838 – June 9, 1927), later Victoria Woodhull Martin, was an American leader of the women's suffrage movement who ran for president of the United States in the 1872 election. While many historians and authors agree that Woodhull was the first woman to run for the presidency, some disagree with classifying it as a true candidacy because according to the Constitution she would have been too young to be president if elected.

An activist for women's rights and labor reforms, Woodhull was also an advocate of "free love", by which she meant the freedom to marry, divorce and bear children without social restriction or government interference. "They cannot roll back the rising tide of reform", she often said. "The world moves."

Woodhull twice went from rags to riches, her first fortune being made on the road as a magnetic healer before she joined the spiritualist movement in the 1870s. Together with her sister, Tennessee Claflin, she was the first woman to operate a brokerage firm on Wall Street, making a second fortune. They were among the first women to found a newspaper in the United States, Woodhull & Claflin's Weekly, which began publication in 1870. Authorship of many of her articles is disputed (many of her speeches on these topics were collaborations between Woodhull, her backers, and her second husband, Colonel James Blood).

Woodhull was politically active in the early 1870s when she was nominated as the first woman candidate for the United States presidency. Woodhull was the candidate in 1872 from the Equal Rights Party, supporting women's suffrage and equal rights; her running mate (unbeknownst to him) was abolitionist leader Frederick Douglass. Her campaign inspired at least one other woman – apart from her sister – to run for Congress. A check on her activities occurred when she was arrested on obscenity charges a few days before the election. Her paper had published an account of the alleged adulterous affair between the prominent minister Henry Ward Beecher and Elizabeth Richards Tilton that had rather more detail than was considered proper at the time. However, it all added to the sensational coverage of her candidacy.

== Early life and education ==
Victoria California Claflin was born the seventh of ten children (six of whom survived to maturity), in the rural frontier town of Homer, Licking County, Ohio. Her mother, Mrs Roxanna "Roxy" Hummel Claflin, was born to unmarried parents and was illiterate. She had become a follower of the Austrian mystic Franz Mesmer and the new spiritualist movement. Her father, Reuben Buckman "Buck" Claflin, Esq., was a con man, lawyer and snake oil salesman. He came from an impoverished branch of the Massachusetts-based Scots-American Claflin family, semi-distant cousins to Massachusetts Governor William Claflin.

Woodhull was whipped by her father, according to biographer Theodore Tilton. Biographer Barbara Goldsmith claimed she was also starved and sexually abused by her father when still very young. Goldsmith based her incest claim on a statement in Theodore Tilton's biography: "But the parents, as if not unwilling to be rid of a daughter whose sorrow was ripening her into a woman before her time, were delighted at the unexpected offer." Biographer Myra MacPherson disputes Goldsmith's claim that "Vickie often intimated that he sexually abused her" as well as the accuracy of Goldsmith's saying that "Years later, Vickie would say that Buck made her 'a woman before my time.'" Macpherson wrote, "Not only did Victoria not say this, there was no 'often' involved, nor was it about incest."

Woodhull believed in spiritualism – she referred to "Banquo's Ghost" from Shakespeare's Macbeth – because it gave her belief in a better life. She said that she was guided in 1868 by Demosthenes to what symbolism to use supporting her theories of Free Love.

As they grew older, Victoria became close to her sister Tennessee Celeste Claflin (called Tennie), seven years her junior and the last child born to the family. As adults, they collaborated in founding a stock brokerage and newspaper in New York City.

By age 11, Woodhull had only three years of formal education, but her teachers found her to be extremely intelligent. She was forced to leave school and home with her family when her father, after having "insured it heavily", burned the family's rotting gristmill. When he tried to get compensated by insurance, his arson and fraud were discovered; he was run off by a group of town vigilantes. The town held a "benefit" to raise funds to pay for the rest of the family's departure from Ohio.

== Marriages ==
=== First marriage and family ===
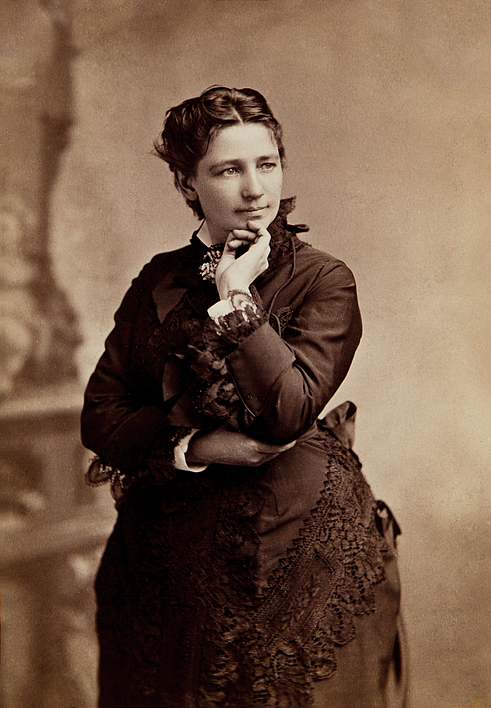
Victoria Woodhull, c. 1860s

When she was 14, Victoria met 28-year-old Canning Woodhull (listed as "Channing" in some records), a doctor from a town outside Rochester, New York. Her family had consulted him to treat the girl for a chronic illness. Woodhull practiced medicine in Ohio at a time when the state did not require formal medical education and licensing. By some accounts, Woodhull abducted Victoria to marry her. Woodhull claimed to be the nephew of Caleb Smith Woodhull, mayor of New York City from 1849 to 1851; he was in fact a distant cousin.

They were married on November 20, 1853. Their marriage certificate was recorded in Cleveland on November 23, 1853, when Victoria was two months past her 15th birthday.

Victoria soon learned that her new husband was an alcoholic and a womanizer. She often had to work outside the home to support the family. She and Canning had two children, Byron and Zulu (later called Zula) Maude Woodhull. Byron was born with an intellectual disability in 1854, a condition Victoria believed was caused by her husband's alcoholism. Another version recounted that her son's disability was caused by a fall from a window. After their children were born, Victoria divorced her husband and kept his surname.

=== Second marriage ===
About 1866, Woodhull married Colonel James Harvey Blood, who also was marrying for a second time. He had served in the Union Army in Missouri during the American Civil War, and had been elected as city auditor of St. Louis, Missouri.

=== Free love ===
Woodhull's support of free love may have started after she discovered the infidelity of her first husband, Canning. Women who married in the United States during the 19th century were bound into the unions, even if loveless, with few options to escape. Divorce was limited by law and considered socially scandalous. Women who divorced were stigmatized and often ostracized by society. Victoria Woodhull concluded that women should have the choice to leave unbearable marriages.

Woodhull believed in monogamous relationships, although she also said she had the right to change her mind. The choice to have sex or not was, in every case, the woman's choice, since this would place her in an equal status to the man, who had the capability to physically overcome and rape a woman, whereas a woman did not have that capability with respect to a man. Woodhull said:

To woman, by nature, belongs the right of sexual determination. When the instinct is aroused in her, then and then only should commerce follow. When woman rises from sexual slavery to sexual freedom, into the ownership and control of her sexual organs, and man is obliged to respect this freedom, then will this instinct become pure and holy; then will woman be raised from the iniquity and morbidness in which she now wallows for existence, and the intensity and glory of her creative functions be increased a hundred-fold ... .

In this same speech, which became known as the "Steinway speech", delivered on Monday, November 20, 1871, in Steinway Hall, New York City, Woodhull said of free love:

Yes, I am a Free Lover. I have an inalienable, constitutional and natural right to love whom I may, to love as long or as short a period as I can; to change that love every day if I please, and with that right neither you nor any law you can frame have any right to interfere.

Woodhull railed against the hypocrisy of society's tolerating married men who had mistresses and engaged in other sexual dalliances. In 1872, Woodhull publicly criticized well-known clergyman Henry Ward Beecher for adultery. Beecher was known to have had an affair with his parishioner Elizabeth Tilton, who had confessed to it, and the scandal was covered nationally. Woodhull was prosecuted on obscenity charges for sending accounts of the affair through the federal mail, and she was briefly jailed. This added to sensational coverage during her campaign that autumn for the United States presidency.

=== Prostitution rumors and stance ===
Woodhull spoke out in person against prostitution and considered marriage for material gain a form of it but in her journal, Woodhull & Claflin's Weekly, Woodhull expressed support for the legalization of prostitution. A personal account from one of Colonel Blood's friends suggests that Tennessee was held against her will in a brothel until Woodhull rescued her, but this story remains unconfirmed.

=== Religious shift and repudiation of free love ===
While Woodhull's earlier radicalism had stemmed from the Christian socialism of the 1850s, for most of her life, she was involved in Spiritualism and she did not use religious language in her public speeches. However, in 1875, Woodhull began to publicly espouse Christianity and she changed her political stances. She exposed Spiritualist frauds in her periodical, alienating her Spiritualist followers. She wrote articles against promiscuity, calling it a "curse of society". Woodhull repudiated her earlier views on free love, and began idealizing purity, motherhood, marriage, and the Bible in her writings. She further claimed that some works had been written in her name without her consent, an assertion which many historians have found dubious.

== Careers ==
=== Stockbroker ===
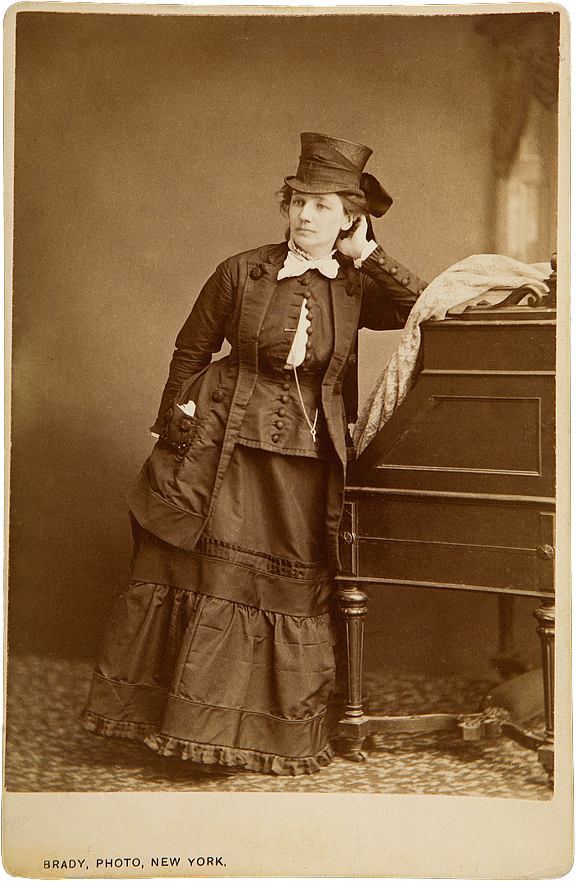
Cabinet card of Woodhull by Mathew Brady, 1866–73

Woodhull, with sister Tennessee (Tennie) Claflin, became the first female stockbrokers and in 1870 they opened a brokerage firm on Wall Street. Wall Street brokers were shocked. "Petticoats Among the Bovine and Ursine Animals", the New York Sun headlined. Woodhull, Claflin & Company opened in 1870, with the assistance of the wealthy Cornelius Vanderbilt, an admirer of Woodhull's skills as a medium; he is rumored to have been Tennie's lover, and to have seriously considered marrying her. Woodhull made a fortune on the New York Stock Exchange by advising clients like Vanderbilt. On one occasion she told him to sell his shares short for 150 cents per stock, which he duly followed, and earned millions on the deal. The New York Herald hailed Woodhull and Claflin as "the Queens of Finance" and "the Bewitching Brokers." Many contemporary men's journals (e.g., The Days' Doings) published sexualized images of the pair running their firm (although they did not participate in the day-to-day business of the firm), linking the concept of publicly minded, un-chaperoned women with ideas of "sexual immorality" and prostitution.

=== Newspaper editor ===
On May 14, 1870, Woodhull and Claflin used the money they had made from their brokerage to found a newspaper, the Woodhull & Claflin's Weekly, which at its height had a national circulation of 20,000. Its primary purpose was to support Victoria Claflin Woodhull for President of the United States. Published for the next six years, feminism was the Weekly's primary interest, but it became notorious for publishing controversial opinions on taboo topics, advocating among other things sex education, free love, women's suffrage, short skirts, spiritualism, vegetarianism, and licensed prostitution. History often states the paper advocated birth control, but some historians disagree. The paper is now known for printing the first English version of Karl Marx's Communist Manifesto in its edition of December 30, 1871. James Blood and Stephen Pearl Andrews wrote the majority of the articles, as well as other able contributors.

In 1872, the Weekly published a story that set off a national scandal and preoccupied the public for months. Henry Ward Beecher, a renowned preacher of Brooklyn's Plymouth Church, had condemned Woodhull's free love philosophy in his sermons but a member of his church, Theodore Tilton, disclosed to Elizabeth Cady Stanton, a colleague of Woodhull, that his wife had confessed Beecher was committing adultery with her. Provoked by such hypocrisy, Woodhull decided to expose Beecher. He ended up standing trial in 1875, for adultery in a proceeding that proved to be one of the most sensational legal episodes of the era, gripping the attention of hundreds of thousands of Americans: the trial ended with a hung jury, but the church won the case hands down. On November 2, 1872, Woodhull, Claflin and Col. Blood were arrested and charged with publishing an obscene newspaper and circulating it through the United States Postal Service. In the raid, 3,000 copies of the newspaper were found. It was this arrest and Woodhull's acquittal that propelled Congress to pass the 1873 Comstock Laws.

George Francis Train once defended her. Other feminists of her time, including Susan B. Anthony, disagreed with her tactics in pushing for women's equality. Some characterized her as opportunistic and unpredictable; in one notable incident, she had a run-in with Anthony during the May 1872 meeting of the National Women's Suffrage Association (NWSA) where Anthony turned off the stage lights when Woodhull was trying to speak. (The radical NWSA later merged with the conservative American Women's Suffrage Association [AWSA] to form the National American Woman Suffrage Association.)

=== Women's rights advocate ===
Woodhull learned how to infiltrate the all-male domain of national politics and arranged to testify on women's suffrage before the House Judiciary Committee. In December 1870, she submitted a memorial in support of the New Departure to the House Committee. She read the memorial aloud to the committee, arguing that women already had the right to vote – all they had to do was use it – since the 14th and 15th Amendments guaranteed the protection of that right for all citizens. The simple but powerful logic of her argument impressed some committee members. Learning of Woodhull's planned address, suffrage leaders postponed the opening of the 1871 National Woman Suffrage Association's third annual convention in Washington in order to attend the committee hearing. Susan B. Anthony, Elizabeth Cady Stanton, and Isabella Beecher Hooker, saw Woodhull as the newest champion of their cause. They applauded her statement: "[W]omen are the equals of men before the law, and are equal in all their rights."

With the power of her first public appearance as a woman's rights advocate, Woodhull moved to the leadership circle of the suffrage movement. Although her constitutional argument was not original, she focused unprecedented public attention on suffrage. Woodhull was the second woman to petition Congress in person (the first was Elizabeth Cady Stanton). Numerous newspapers reported her appearance before Congress. Frank Leslie's Illustrated Newspaper printed a full-page engraving of Woodhull, surrounded by prominent suffragists, delivering her argument.

=== First International ===
Woodhull joined the International Workingmen's Association, also known as the First International. She supported its goals by articles in her newspaper. In the United States, many Yankee radicals, former abolitionists and other progressive activists, became involved in the organization, which had been founded in England. German-American and ethnic Irish nearly lost control of the organization, and feared its goals were going to be lost in the broad-based, democratic egalitarianism promoted by the Americans. In 1871, the Germans expelled most of the English-speaking members of the First International's U.S. sections, leading to the quick decline of the organization, as it failed to attract the ethnic working class in America. Karl Marx commented disparagingly on Woodhull in 1872, and expressed approval of the expulsions.

Recent scholarship has shown Woodhull to have been a far more significant presence in the socialist movement than previous historians had allowed. Woodhull thought of herself as a revolutionary and her conception of social and political reorganization was, like Marx, based upon economics. In an article titled "Woman Suffrage in the United States" in 1896, she concluded that "suffrage is only one phase of the larger question of women's emancipation. More important is the question of her social and economic position. Her financial independence underlies all the rest." Ellen Carol DuBois refers to her as a "socialist feminist."

=== Presidential candidate ===
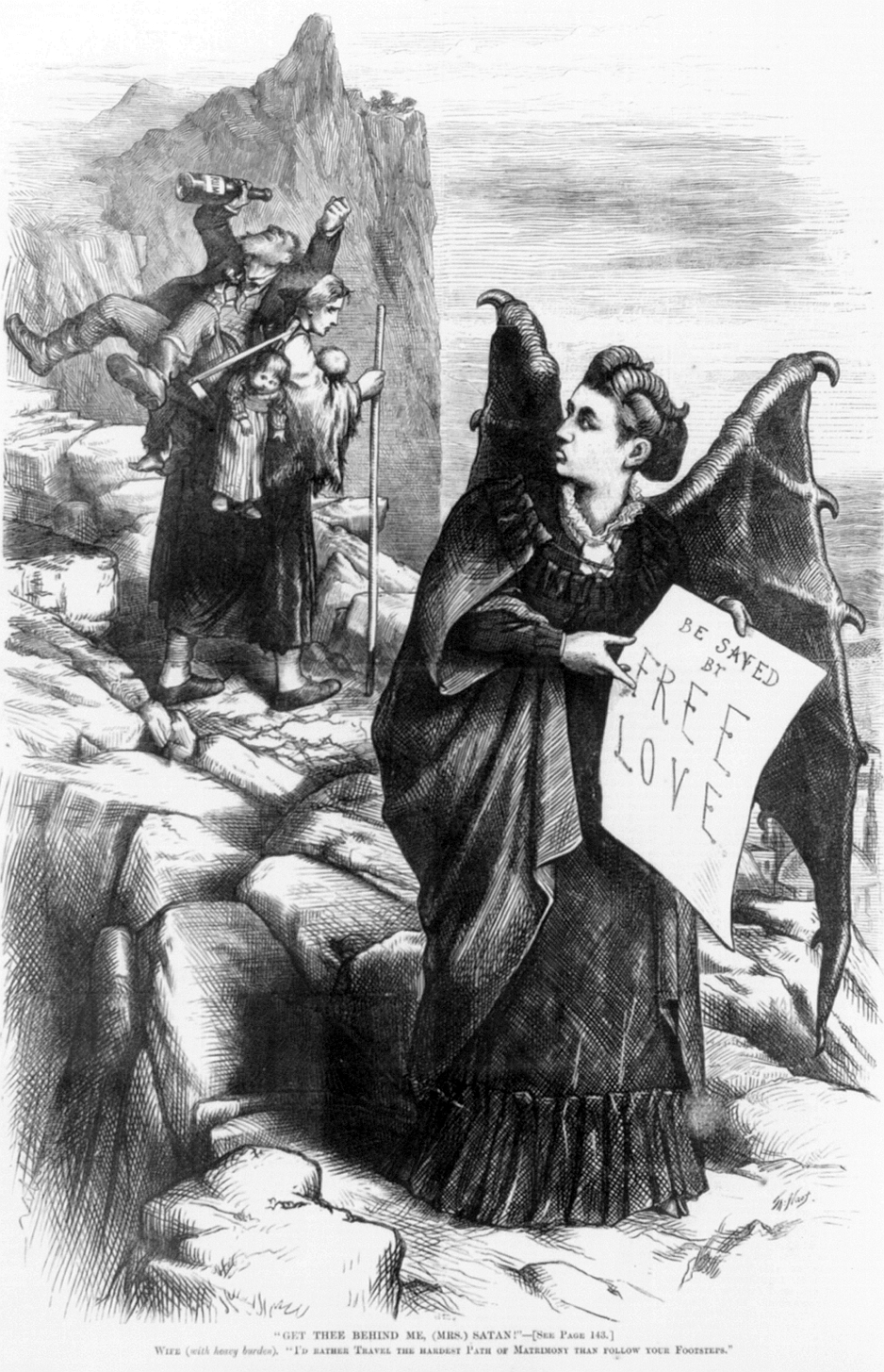
"Get thee behind me, (Mrs.) Satan!" 1872 caricature by Thomas Nast: Wife, carrying a heavy burden of children and drunk husband, admonishing (Mrs.) Satan (Victoria Woodhull), "I'd rather travel the hardest path of matrimony than follow your footsteps." Mrs. Satan's sign reads, "Be saved by free love."

On April 2, 1870, Woodhull's letter to the editor of the New York Herald was published, announcing her candidacy. She was influenced by retired Civil War general and congressman Benjamin Butler by basing her candidacy on the idea that there was no need for women to have special legislation to win suffrage as they already had attained it through the 14th and 15th Amendments of the Constitution.

Woodhull was nominated for president of the United States by the newly formed Equal Rights Party on May 10, 1872, at Apollo Hall, New York City. A year earlier, she had announced her intention to run. Also in 1871, she publicly spoke out against the government only being composed of men; she proposed the development of a new constitution and the creation of a new government a year thence. Her nomination was ratified at the convention on June 6, 1872, making her the first woman candidate.

Woodhull's campaign was also notable because Frederick Douglass was nominated as its vice-presidential candidate, even though he did not take part in the convention. He did not acknowledge his nomination and did not play any active role in the campaign. His nomination stirred up controversy about the mixing of white and black people in public life, and fears of miscegenation. The Equal Rights Party hoped to use the nominations to reunite suffragists with African-American civil rights activists, because the exclusion of female suffrage from the Fifteenth Amendment two years earlier had caused a substantial rift between the groups.

Having been vilified in the media for her support of free love, Woodhull devoted an issue of Woodhull & Claflin's Weekly (November 2, 1872) to an alleged adulterous affair between Elizabeth Tilton and Reverend Henry Ward Beecher, a prominent Protestant minister in Brooklyn. He supported female suffrage but had lectured against free love in his sermons. Woodhull published the article to highlight what she saw as a sexual double standard between men and women.

That same day, a few days before the presidential election, U.S. Federal Marshals arrested Woodhull, her second husband, Colonel James Blood, and her sister Tennie on charges of "publishing an obscene newspaper" because of the content of this issue. The sisters were held in the Ludlow Street Jail for the next month, a place normally reserved for civil offenses but that also held more hardened criminals. The arrest was arranged by Anthony Comstock, the self-appointed moral defender of the nation at the time. Opponents raised questions about censorship and government persecution. The three were acquitted on a technicality six months later, but the arrest prevented Woodhull from attempting to vote during the 1872 presidential election. With the publication of the scandal, Theodore Tilton, Elizabeth's husband, sued Beecher for "criminal conversation" (adultery) and alienation of affection. The 1875 trial was sensationalized across the nation and resulted in a hung jury.

Woodhull received no electoral votes in the election of 1872, an election in which six different candidates received at least one electoral vote, and a negligible, but unknown, percentage of the popular vote. A man in Texas said that he had voted for her, saying he was casting his vote against Grant.

Woodhull again tried to gain nominations for the presidency in 1884 and 1892. Newspapers reported that her 1892 attempt culminated in her nomination by the "National Woman Suffragists' Nominating Convention" on September 21. Marietta L. B. Stow of California was nominated as the candidate for vice president. The convention was held at Willard's Hotel in Boonville, New York, and Anna M. Parker was its president. Some women's suffrage organizations repudiated the nominations, claiming that the nominating committee was unauthorized. Woodhull was quoted as saying that she was "destined" by "prophecy" to be elected president of the United States in the upcoming election.

== Life in England and third marriage ==
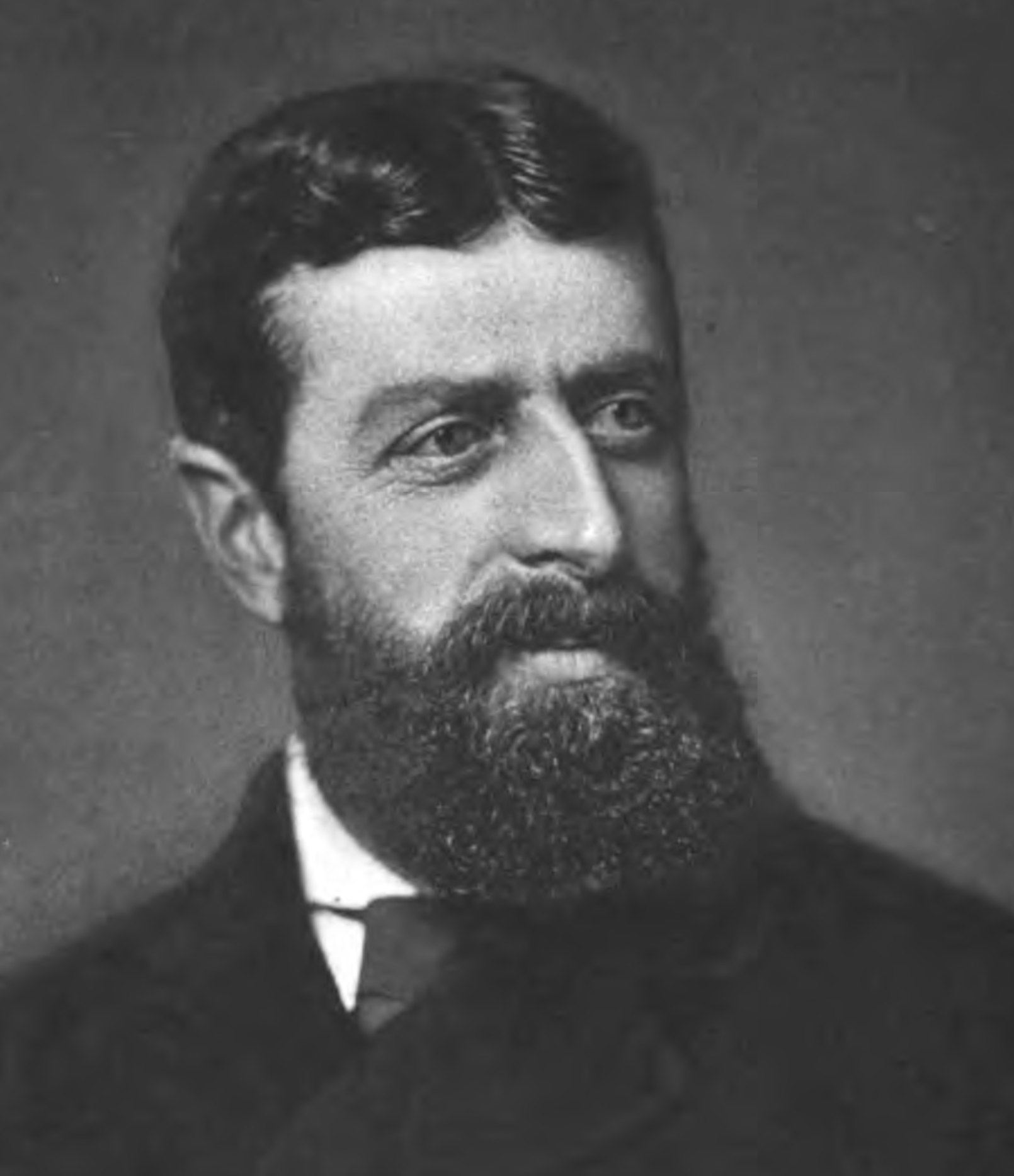
John Biddulph Martin

In October 1876, Woodhull divorced her second husband, Colonel Blood. After Cornelius Vanderbilt's death in 1877, William Henry Vanderbilt paid Woodhull and her sister Claflin $1,000 (equivalent to $30,000 in 2025) to leave the country because he was worried they might testify in hearings on the distribution of the elder Vanderbilt's estate. The sisters accepted the offer and moved to Great Britain in August 1877.

She made her first public appearance as a lecturer at St. James's Hall in London on December 4, 1877. Her lecture was called "The Human Body, the Temple of God", a lecture which she had previously presented in the United States. Present at one of her lectures was the banker John Biddulph Martin. They began to see each other and married on October 31, 1883. His family disapproved of the union.

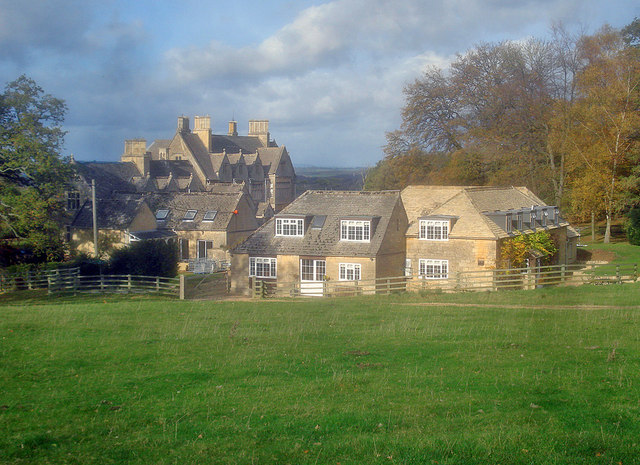
Norton Park, Bredon's Norton

From then on, she was known as Victoria Woodhull Martin. Under that name, she published the magazine The Humanitarian from 1892 to 1901 with help from her daughter, Zula Woodhull. Her husband John died in 1897. After 1901, Martin gave up publishing and retired to the country, establishing residence at Norton Park, Bredon's Norton, Worcestershire, where she built a village school with Tennessee and Zula. Through her work at the Bredon's Norton school, she became a champion for education reform in English village schools with the addition of kindergarten curriculum.

She was active in the pioneering days of female motorists, with the Ladies' Automobile Club, and was reputed to have been the first woman to drive a car in Hyde Park, London and in the English country roads.

== Views on abortion and eugenics ==
Woodhull expressed thoughts on abortion:

Every woman knows that if she were free, she would never bear an unwished-for child, nor think of murdering one before its birth.

In one of her speeches, she states:

The rights of children, then, as individuals, begin while yet they are in foetal life. Children do not come into existence by any will or consent of their own.

At the Woodhull and Claflin's Weekly, on an essay called When Is It Not Murder to Take a Life?, she asserts:

Many women who would be shocked at the very thought of killing their children after birth, deliberately destroy them previously. If there is any difference in the actual crime we should be glad to have those who practice the latter, point it out. The truth of the matter is that it is just as much a murder to destroy life in its embryotic condition, as it is to destroy it after the fully developed form is attained, for it is the self-same life that is taken.

Later in the same essay she asks:

Can any one suggest a better than to so situate woman, that she may never be obligated to conceive a life she does not desire shall be continuous?

Woodhull also promoted eugenics, which was popular in the early 20th century. Her views on eugenics tied into her views on abortion, because she blamed abortion for assorted problems with pregnancies. Her interest in eugenics might have been motivated by the profound intellectual impairment of her son. She advocated, among other things, sex education, "marrying well", and pre-natal care as a way to bear healthier children and prevent mental and physical disease. Her writings express views which are closer to the views of anarchist eugenicists, rather than the views of coercive eugenicists like Sir Francis Galton. In 2006, publisher Michael W. Perry discovered writings which show that Woodhull supported the forcible sterilization of people who she considered unfit to breed. He published these writings in his book "Lady Eugenist". He cited a New York Times article from 1927 in which she concurred with the ruling of the case Buck v. Bell. This was in stark contrast to her earlier works in which she advocated social freedom and opposed governmental interference in matters of love and marriage.

Woodhull Martin died on June 9, 1927, at Norton Park in Bredon's Norton.

== Legacy and honors ==
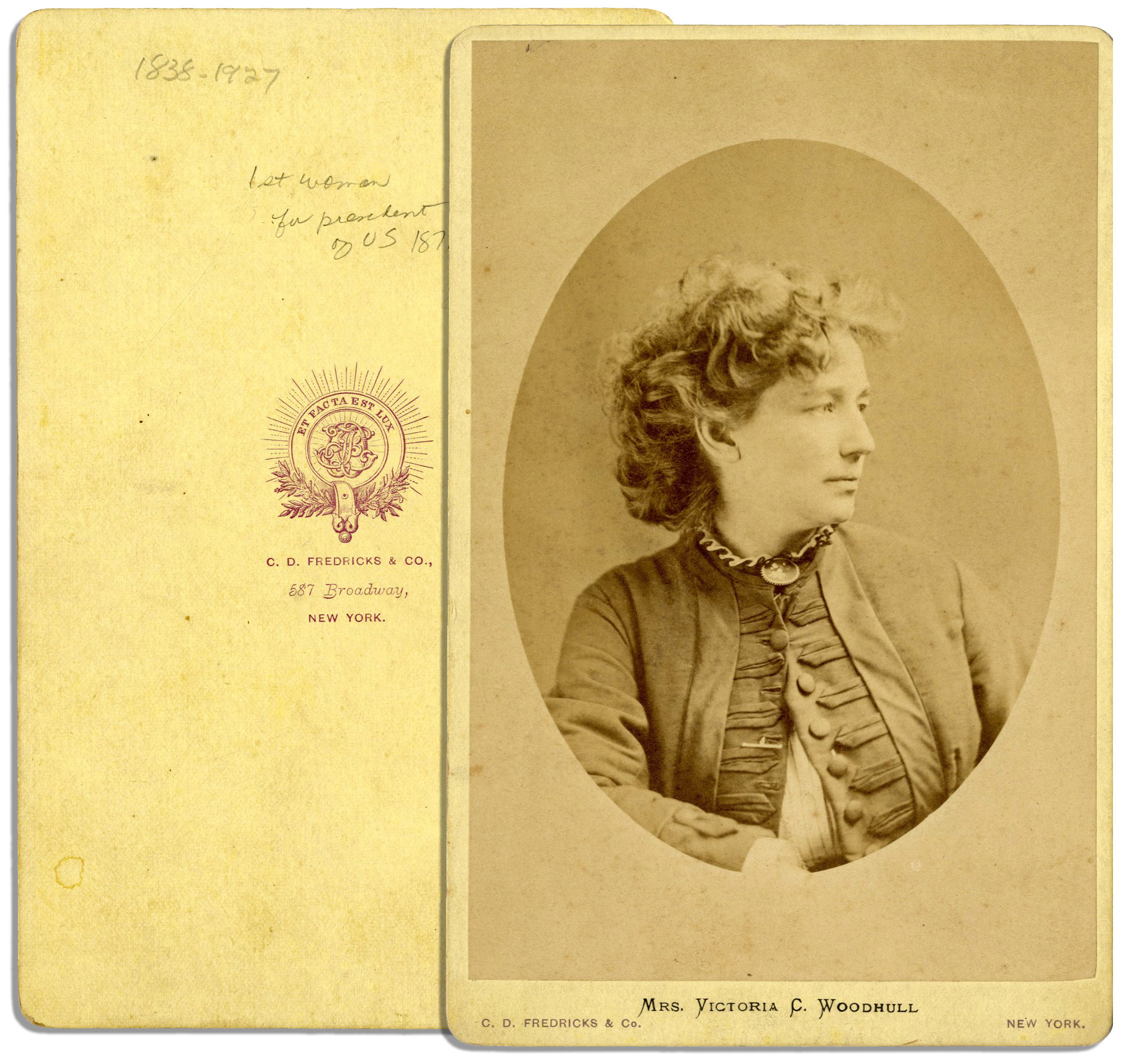
Cabinet card portrait photograph, circa 1870

Woodhull was photographed several times by Mathew Brady, well known for his photographs of the American Civil War.

There is a wall memorial to Victoria Woodhull Martin at Tewkesbury Abbey in England.

A historical marker outside the Homer Public Library in Licking County, Ohio describes Woodhull as the "First Woman Candidate For President of the United States."

There is a memorial clock tower in her honor at the Robbins Hunter Museum, Granville, Ohio. A likeness of Victoria made of linden wood appears on the hours.

The 1980 Broadway musical Onward Victoria was inspired by Woodhull's life.

The Woodhull Institute for Ethical Leadership was founded by Naomi Wolf and Margot Magowan in 1997.

In 2001, Victoria Woodhull was posthumously inducted into the National Women's Hall of Fame.

The Woodhull Sexual Freedom Alliance is an American human rights and sexual freedom advocacy organization, it was founded in 2003, and it is named in honor of Victoria Woodhull.

She was honored by the Office of the Manhattan Borough President in March 2008 and she was also included on a map of historical sites which are related or dedicated to important women.

External audio
- Mrs. President
- Get to Know The First Woman Who Ever Ran for President, 7:57, The Takeaway, WNYC

On September 26, 2008, she was posthumously awarded the "Ronald H. Brown Trailblazer Award" from the St. John's University School of Law in Queens, New York. Mary L. Shearer, owner of the registered trademark Victoria Woodhull and a great-granddaughter of Col. James H. Blood's step-son, accepted the award on Victoria Woodhull's behalf. Trailblazer Awards are presented "to individuals whose work and activities in the business and community demonstrate a commitment to uplifting under-represented groups and individuals."

Victoria Bond composed the opera Mrs. President about Woodhull. It premiered in 2012 in Anchorage, Alaska.

In March 2017, Amazon Studios announced production of a movie based on her life, produced by and starring Brie Larson as Victoria Woodhull.

== Bibliography ==
- 2010 - Selected writings of Victoria Woodhull. Suffrage, free love, and eugenics. Lincoln: University of Nebraska Press ISBN 978-0-8032-1647-1

== Literature ==
- 2000 - Jacqueline McLean. Victoria Woodhull. First woman presidential candidate. Morgan Reynolds ISBN 9781883846473
- 2004 - Amanda Frisken. Victoria Woodhull's sexual revolution. Political theater and the popular press in nineteenthe-century America. Philadelphia: University of Pennsylvania Press ISBN 0-8122-3798-6
- 2010 - Selected writings of Victoria Woodhull. Suffrage, free love, and eugenics. Lincoln: University of Nebraska Press ISBN 978-0-8032-1647-1

== See also ==
- Belva Ann Lockwood
- List of civil rights leaders
- List of suffragists and suffragettes
- List of women's rights activists
- Ezra Heywood
- Swami Laura Horos
- Timeline of women's rights (other than voting)
- Timeline of women's suffrage
- International Workingmen's Association in America
