= Joseph S. Labill =

American Civil War soldier

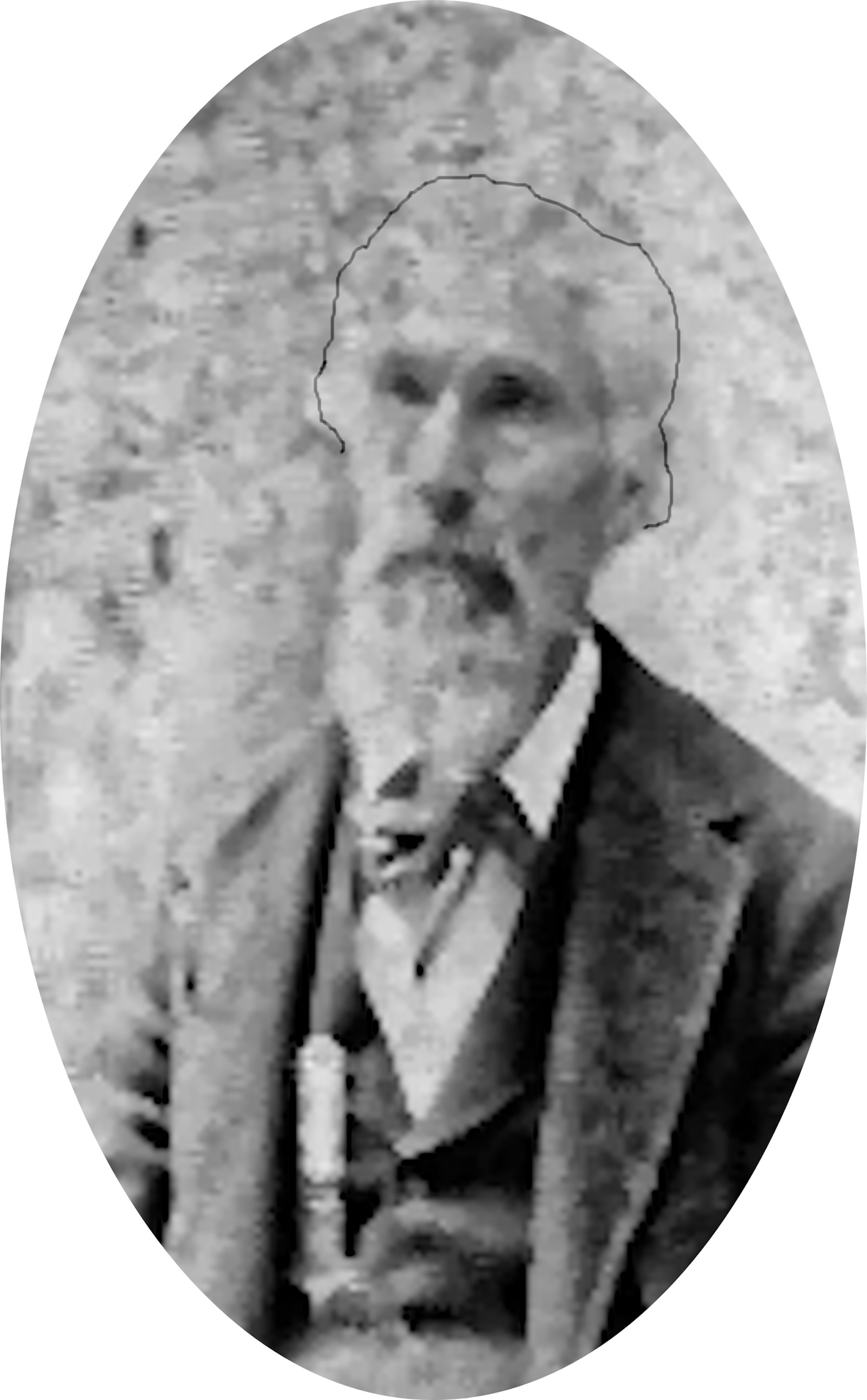
- Born: 1837; France
- Died: 1911 (aged 73–74)
- Military career
- Allegiance: United States of America; Union
- Branch: United States Army; Union Army
- Rank: Private
- Units: Company C, 6th Missouri Volunteer Infantry
- Conflicts: American Civil War
- Awards: Medal of Honor

Joseph S. Labill (1837–1911) was a Private in the Union Army and a Medal of Honor recipient for his role in the American Civil War.

He is buried in South Hill Cemetery Vandalia, Illinois.

== Medal of Honor citation ==
Rank and organization: Private, Company C, 6th Missouri Infantry. Place and date: At Vicksburg, Miss., May 22, 1863. Entered service at: Vandalia, Ill. Birth: France. Date of issue: August 14, 1894.

Citation:

Gallantry in the charge of the "volunteer storming party."

== See also ==
- List of Medal of Honor recipients
- List of American Civil War Medal of Honor recipients: G–L
