= Joseph Wortick =

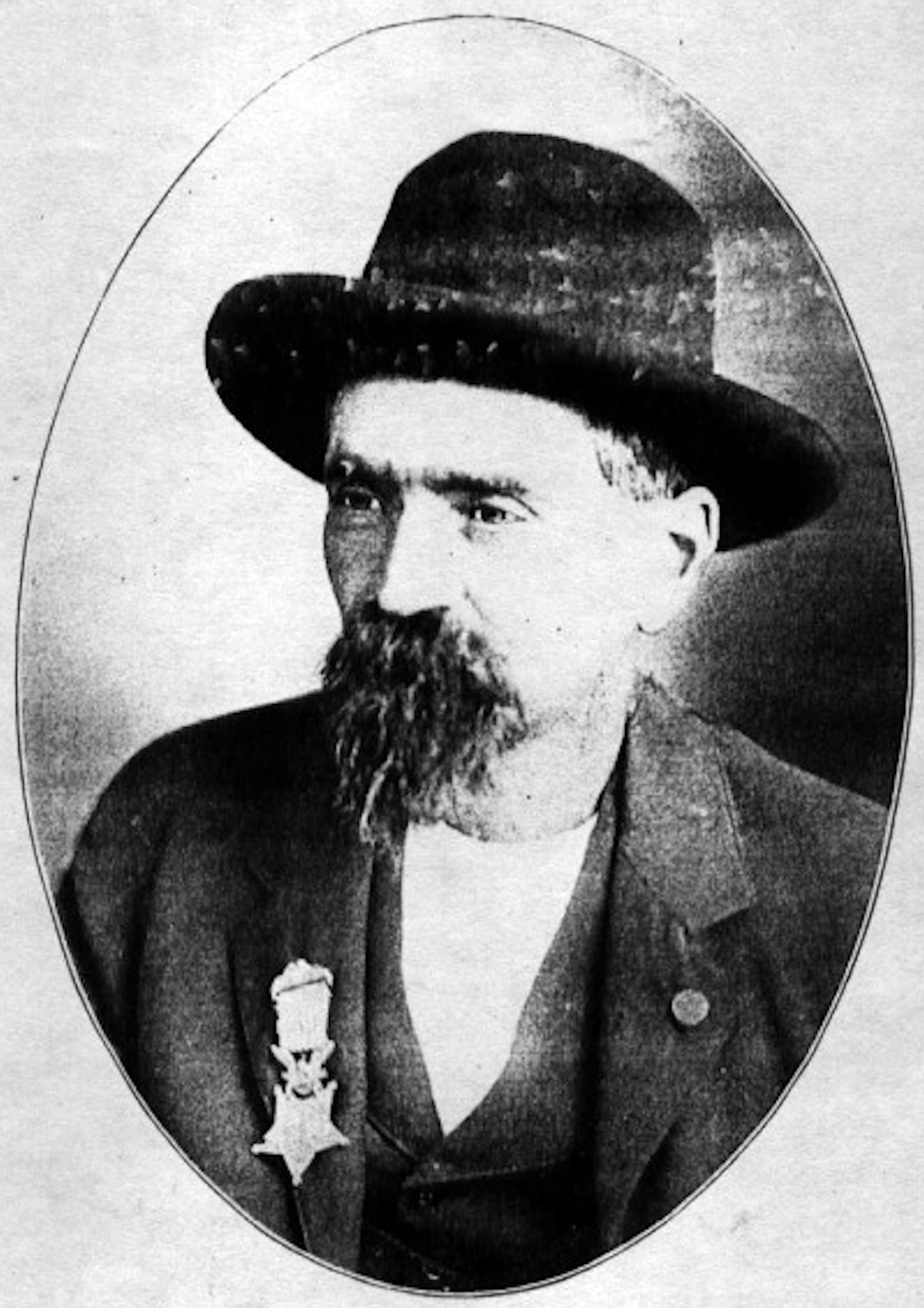
- Born: November 20, 1837; Fayette County, Pennsylvania
- Died: April 7, 1910 (aged 72); Leon, Kansas
- Burial place: Leon Cemetery, Leon, Kansas
- Military career
- Allegiance: United States
- Branch: United States Army; Union Army
- Rank: Private
- Units: Company A, 6th Missouri Volunteer Infantry
- Conflicts: American Civil War • Siege of Vicksburg
- Awards: Medal of Honor

Joseph Wortick (1837 – 1910) was a Union Army soldier during the American Civil War. He received the Medal of Honor for gallantry during the Siege of Vicksburg on May 22, 1863. Variant spellings of the surname are Wartick and Wertick.

== Private life ==
Born on November 20, 1837, in Fayette County, Pennsylvania to Simon Wartick and Margaret Ann Chron Wartick. The family moved to Adams County, Illinois in 1854. Married Nancy Elizabeth Odell in 1866. They had two sons, John Alvin and William Sherman. John Alvin died in 1869. In 1896 they moved to Kansas where he lived until his death on Thursday, April 7, 1910, at his home near Hickory creek.

== Union assault ==
On March 5, 1862, Wortick volunteered in Company A 6th Missouri Infantry. Mr. Wortick was the first man in his regiment to step to the front when his Colonel asked for 200 men to storm a redoubt at Vicksburg. Thirty of those men carried heavy planks to bridge a ditch outside of the earth works. The group of men were mowed down like grass. Some were able to reach the ditch and many were killed by grenades thrown over the breast works by the Confederates. Wortick and a first lieutenant were the only ones to cross the ditch but they couldn't stay. Nearly all the storming party was killed or wounded, not a dozen escaped. Later, Wortick was asked if he was afraid to join the forlorn hope. He said, "I don’t know; I heard what my Colonel said, believed it should be done and wanted to help do it. It was pretty bad business. I don’t know how I escaped death." His heroism there and his surviving comrades earned them a Legion of Honor Medal, voted by Congress in recognition of patriotism and valor. He was hit seven times and still carried lead in his body. He recovered from his wounds, then participated in the March to the Sea. He took part in the Grand Review in Washington, D.C. and was finally honorably discharged on May 27, 1865.

== Medal of Honor citation ==
"For gallantry in the charge of the volunteer storming party on 22 May 1863." Because of his misspelled last night of Wortick, he received his award late. Also because of the misspelling, his headstone was also delivered late.

== See also ==
- List of Medal of Honor recipients
- List of American Civil War Medal of Honor recipients: T–Z
