= Henry F. Frizzell =

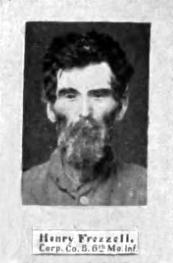
- Born: December 1839; Madison County, Missouri
- Died: 1904 (aged 64–65)
- Burial place: Mount Lebanon Cemetery Saint Ann, Missouri
- Military career
- Allegiance: United States of America; Union
- Branch: United States Army; Union Army
- Service years: 1861 - 1865
- Rank: Private
- Unit: 6th Missouri Volunteer Infantry
- Conflicts: American Civil War
- Awards: Medal of Honor

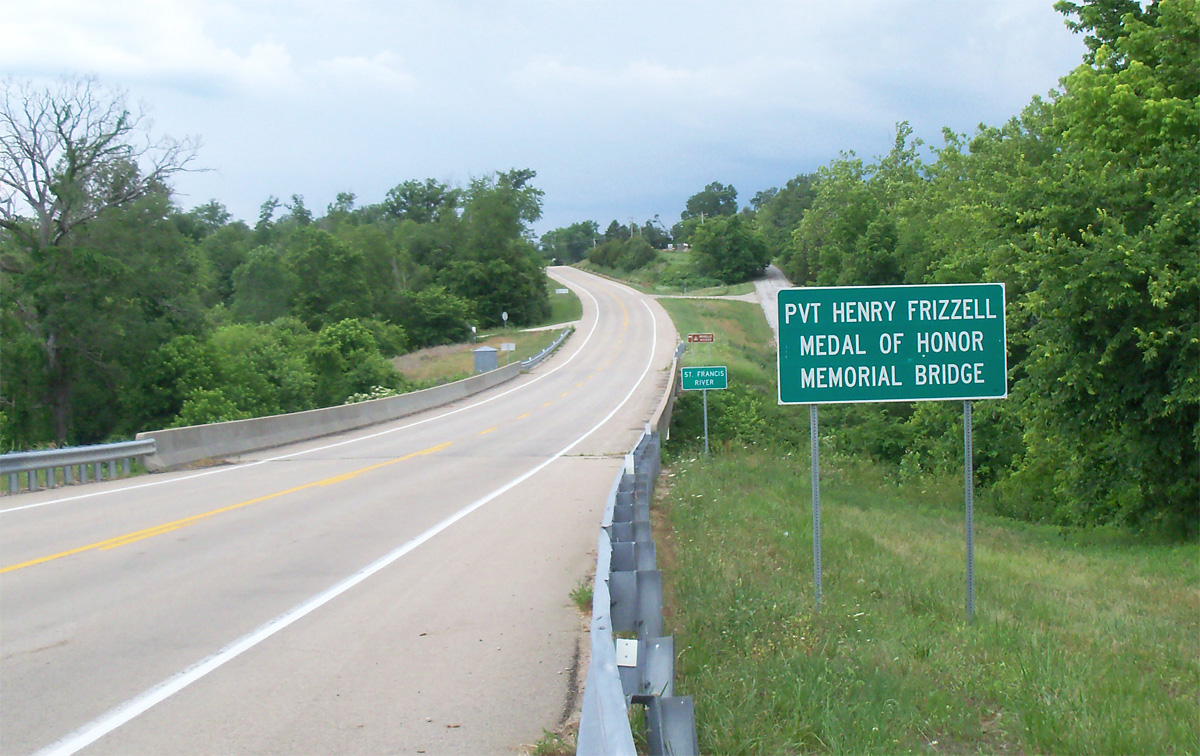
Pvt. Henry Frizzell Memorial Bridge

Henry F. Frizzell (December 1839 – May 1904) was a Union Army soldier and Medal of Honor recipient. A Madision County, Missouri native and self-described "Union Man", he served during the American Civil War. In August 1861, Henry traveled to Camp Blood in Pilot Knob, Missouri and enlisted for 3 years in the 6th Missouri Infantry.

== Biography ==
Two months into his service with the Missouri Infantry he contracted the measles, Bronchitis and sore eyes and was sent to a hospital in Tipton, Missouri. After treatment and recovery, he later rejoined his unit and fought with them at the Battle of Vicksburg in Mississippi. While there Frizzell joined a fighting group of only unmarried volunteers. This group, called Forlorn Hope, was so named because they were not expected to return. This unit was to storm "Fort Hill" as Frizzell described it. This "fort" was actually a patchwork of several well-protected forts and entrenchments, which housed a Confederate garrison of more than 20,000 men. On May 22, 1863, the brave men of Forlorn Hope attacked Fort Hill. At the end of the battle 85% of this volunteer storming party were either killed or badly wounded. Frizzell was one of the wounded that day, suffering a gunshot to the head, breaking the bone by his right eye and losing a portion of his right ear. For his actions on that date he would later receive the Medal of Honor. To this day, he is the only Medal of Honor recipient from Madison County and one of only 77 from Missouri.

Frizzell was captured by the Confederacy that day. A week later he was released by the Confederacy in a prisoner exchange and spent the next two months in a hospital in Memphis, Tennessee. Later in 1863, his unit joined the ranks of General William Tecumseh Sherman and fought in the Battle of Lookout Mountain near Chattanooga. After re-enlisting in January 1864, Frizzell and the 6th Missouri infantry joined General Sherman on his march through Georgia. Frizzell was shot in the left knee on May 14, 1864, at the Battle of Resaca, Georgia. He continued fighting until Lynch Creek, North Carolina, where the Confederates again captured him on March 1, 1865. After escaping, he heard the war was over and, in his own words, "he started working his way back to Madison County as best he could."

Frizzell made it back to Madison County, eventually getting married and having children. He died in 1904 at the age of 67. He is buried in Mount Lebanon Cemetery Saint Ann, Missouri.

=== Medal of Honor citation ===
The President of the United States of America, in the name of Congress, takes pleasure in presenting the Medal of Honor to Private Henry F. Frizzell, United States Army, for gallantry in the charge of the volunteer storming party on 22 May 1863, while serving with Company B, 6th Missouri Infantry, in action at Vicksburg, Mississippi.

== Later Recognition ==
On April 9, 2010, the Missouri Department of Transportation held a Bridge Dedication Ceremony to rename a bridge on Route 72 over the St. Francis River in Madison County in honor of Frizzell, who lived nearby in the Roselle Community.

== See also ==
- List of Medal of Honor recipients
- List of American Civil War Medal of Honor recipients: A–F
