= Nemai Ghosh (photographer) =

Indian photographer (1934–2020)

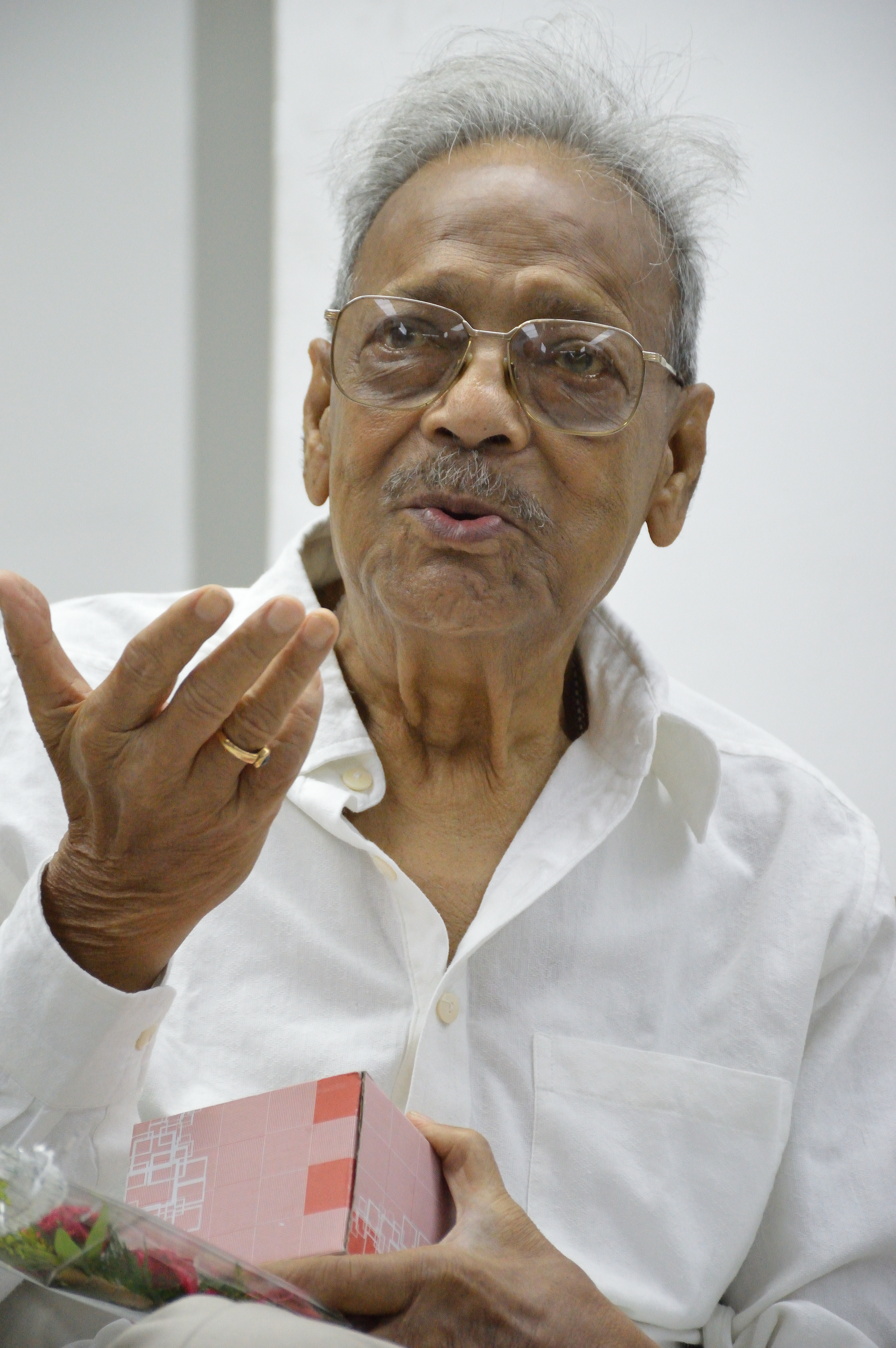
- Nemai Ghosh in April 2019
- Born: 8 May 1934; Calcutta, British India
- Died: 25 March 2020 (aged 85); Kolkata, India
- Occupation: Photographer
- Years active: 1960s–2020
- Spouse: Shibani Ghosh
- Children: Santanu Ghosh, Satyaki Ghosh, Sharmistha Ghosh
- Relatives: Grandchildren - Shreya Ghosh, Soham Ghosh, Pujarini Ghosh, Opashona Ghosh and Nilanjan Ghosh

Nemai Ghosh (8 May 1934 – 25 March 2020) was a noted Indian photographer most known for working with Satyajit Ray, as a still photographer for over two decades, starting with Goopy Gyne Bagha Byne (1969) till Ray's last film Agantuk (1991). His work spans theatre, cinema, art, cultural documentation, and his home city of Kolkata, especially via black-and-white photography that captures both grand moments and intimate, fleeting ones.

He was a jury member at the 2007 National Film Awards, and was awarded the Padma Shri by Government of India in 2010.

== Early life and beginnings ==
- Born in Kolkata (then Calcutta), British India.
- He began his artistic involvement in theatre, performing with Utpal Dutt’s Little Theatre Group.
- His interest in photography was not planned; around 1966, by chance he acquired a camera and began experimenting.

== Personal life and family ==
Nemai Ghosh was married to Shibani Ghosh, who died on 28 March 2022.

The couple had three children:

- Their eldest son, Santanu Ghosh died of a brain tumour on 19 December 2001. He was survived by his wife Dalia Ghosh, daughter Shreya Ghosh, and son Soham Ghosh.
- Their younger son, Satyaki Ghosh, became a photographer, following in his father’s footsteps. He is married to Madhura Ghosh with two daughters, Opashona Ghosh and Pujarini Ghosh.
- Their youngest child, Sharmistha Ghosh, works as an educator.

== Association with Satyajit Ray ==
- His first work with Satyajit Ray was on the film Goopy Gyne Bagha Byne (1969). From that point until Ray’s last film Agantuk (1991), Ghosh served as Ray’s still photographer.
- Satyajit Ray referred to him as a kind of “Boswell” of his life with a camera, in reference to James Boswell, the famous biographer.

He died on 25 March 2020. He was 85.

== Bibliography ==
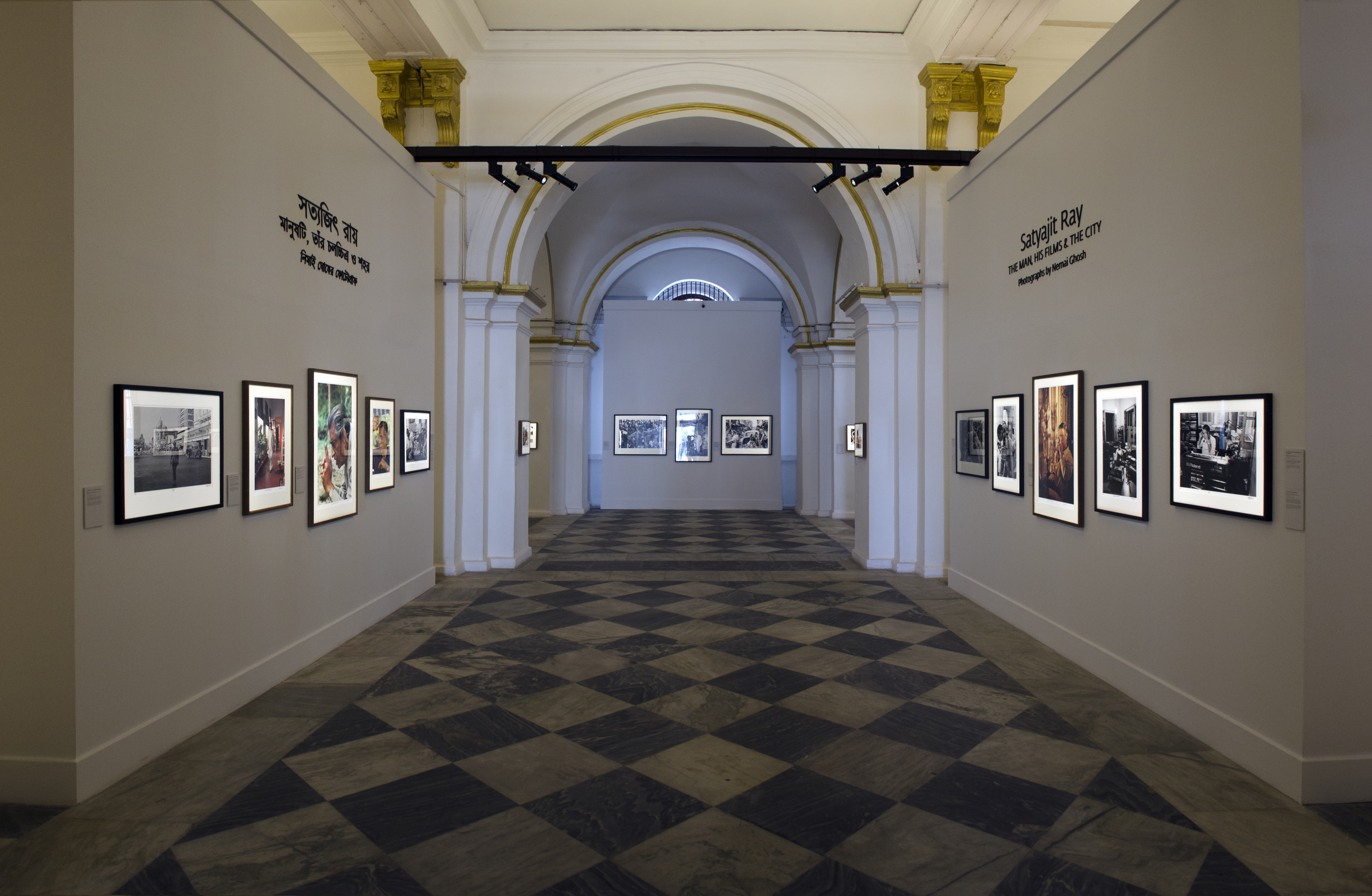
Photographs of Satyajit Ray by Nemai Ghosh at Ghare Baire art gallery, Currency Building, Kolkata

- Satyajit Ray 70 ans; Photographies de Nemai Ghosh; Contributions éditées par Alok B. Nandi,1991, Eiffel Editions, Bruxelles.
- Satyajit Ray at 70; Photographs by Nemai Ghosh; Contributions edited by Alok B. Nandi, 1993, Point of View and Orient Longman
- Nemai Ghosh (2000). Dramatic Moments: Photographs and Memories of Calcutta Theatre from the Sixties to the Nineties. Seagull Books. ISBN 978-81-7046-156-2.
- Nemai Ghosh (2003). Satyajit Ray: From Script to Screen. National Gallery of Modern Art.
- Nemai Ghosh (2004). Ray and the Blind Painter: An Odyssey Into the Inner Eye. New Age. ISBN 978-81-7819-041-9.
- Andrew Robinson; Nemai Ghosh (photographs) (2005). Satyajit Ray: A Vision of Cinema. I. B. Tauris. ISBN 978-1-84511-074-1.
- Nemai Ghosh; Yusuf Arakkal; Stuart Forster; Giridhar Khasnis (2007). The Street: Arakkal Paints a Picture. Art Alive Gallery.
- Nemai Ghosh; Geeti Sen (2007). Faces of Indian Art: Through the Lens of Nemai Ghosh. Art Alive Gallery. ISBN 978-81-901844-5-8.
- Nemai Ghosh (2011). Manik Da: Memoirs Of Satyajit Ray. HarperCollins. ISBN 978-93-5029-040-8.
