= Bredon's Norton =

Village in Worcestershire, England

Coordinates: 52.049346°N 2.102029°W

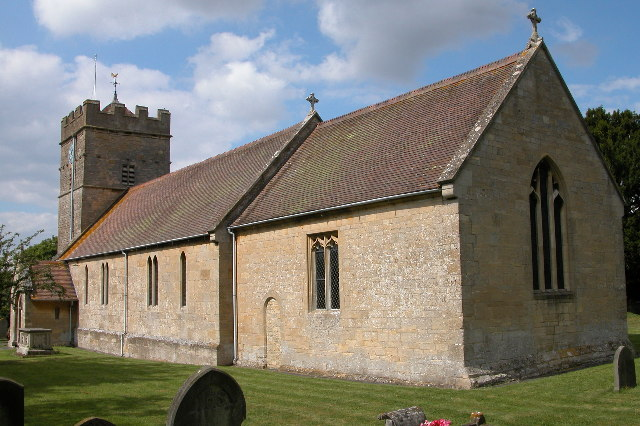

- Location within Worcestershire
- Area: 4.4578 km^{2} (1.7212 sq mi)
- Population: 254 (2021 census)
  - Density: 57/km^{2} (150/sq mi)
- OS grid reference: SO931390
- Civil parish: Bredon's Norton
- District: Wychavon
- Shire county: Worcestershire
- Region: West Midlands
- Country: England
- Sovereign state: United Kingdom
- Post town: Tewkesbury
- Postcode district: GL20
- Police: West Mercia
- Fire: Hereford and Worcester
- Ambulance: West Midlands
- UK Parliament: West Worcestershire
- Website: https://www.bredonsnorton.co.uk/

Bredon's Norton or Norton-by-Bredon is a village and civil parish 11 miles (18 km) south east of Worcester, in the Wychavon district, in the county of Worcestershire, England. In 2021 the parish had a population of 254. The parish touches Eckington, Bredon (with which it shares a Parish Council), Strensham and Kemerton, and almost touches with the town of Tewkesbury in Gloucestershire.

== Features ==
There are 21 listed buildings in Bredon's Norton. St Giles's Church was rebuilt in 1883.

== History ==
The name "Bredon's Norton" means 'Bredon's north farm/settlement'. Bredon's Norton was recorded in the Domesday Book as Nortune. Bredon's Norton was "Nortune" in the 11th century and "Northton" in the 13th century. In the early 12th century Bredon's Norton Manor was held by the Bishop of Worcester. Bredon's Norton became a civil parish in 1866.

== Notable residents ==
- Antarctic explorer Raymond Priestley was born in nearby Tewkesbury and retired to Bredon's Norton. Pieces relating to his life are in Tewkesbury Borough Museum.
- American women's rights activist Victoria Woodhull retired and died in Bredon's Norton.
