= Agra Bank =

Public bank founded in Agra, India (1833–1900)

- Industry: Banking
- Founded: 1833 in Agra, India
- Defunct: 1999
- Fate: Liquidated
- Headquarters: Agra, India

Agra Bank was an Indian bank that was founded in 1833 in Agra (now in the Indian state of Uttar Pradesh), with a capital of £1,000,000 and was finally liquidated in 1900.

== History ==
The bank was founded in 1833, but by 1840 its business was still confined to advances to the military. Attempts to circulate banknotes were blocked by the government but in any case notes had little appeal to the bulk of local residents. A branch was established in Somerset Place, Calcutta and by the mid-1850s Calcutta had become its head office with branches in Madras and Bombay and a London agency. Branches in Lahore and Canton were added and at the end of the 1850s the head office was moved to London.

=== Move to London and the United Service Bank ===
The Agra and United Service Bank was incorporated in England in 1857 and issued banknotes but it was unable to gain entry to the London Bankers' Clearing House.

=== Take over of Masterman's Bank ===
In June 1864 it took over a member of the London Bankers' Clearing House – the London banking partnership of Masterman, Peters, Mildred and Company – and renamed itself Agra and Masterman's Bank. It met strong opposition, suffered share price manipulation and lost customers. By 1866 it had become the leading exchange bank in the East after the Oriental Bank Corporation. Agra and Masterman's was obliged to suspend payment on 6 June 1866 following the panic beginning with the closure of Overend Gurney on 10 May 1866.

=== Agra Bank ===
The remaining Indian portion of its business was reconstituted under the name Agra Bank. and re-opened for business on 7 January 1867. It was liquidated in 1900.

== See also ==
- List of oldest banks in India
