= John Biddulph Martin =

English banker and statistician (1841–1897)

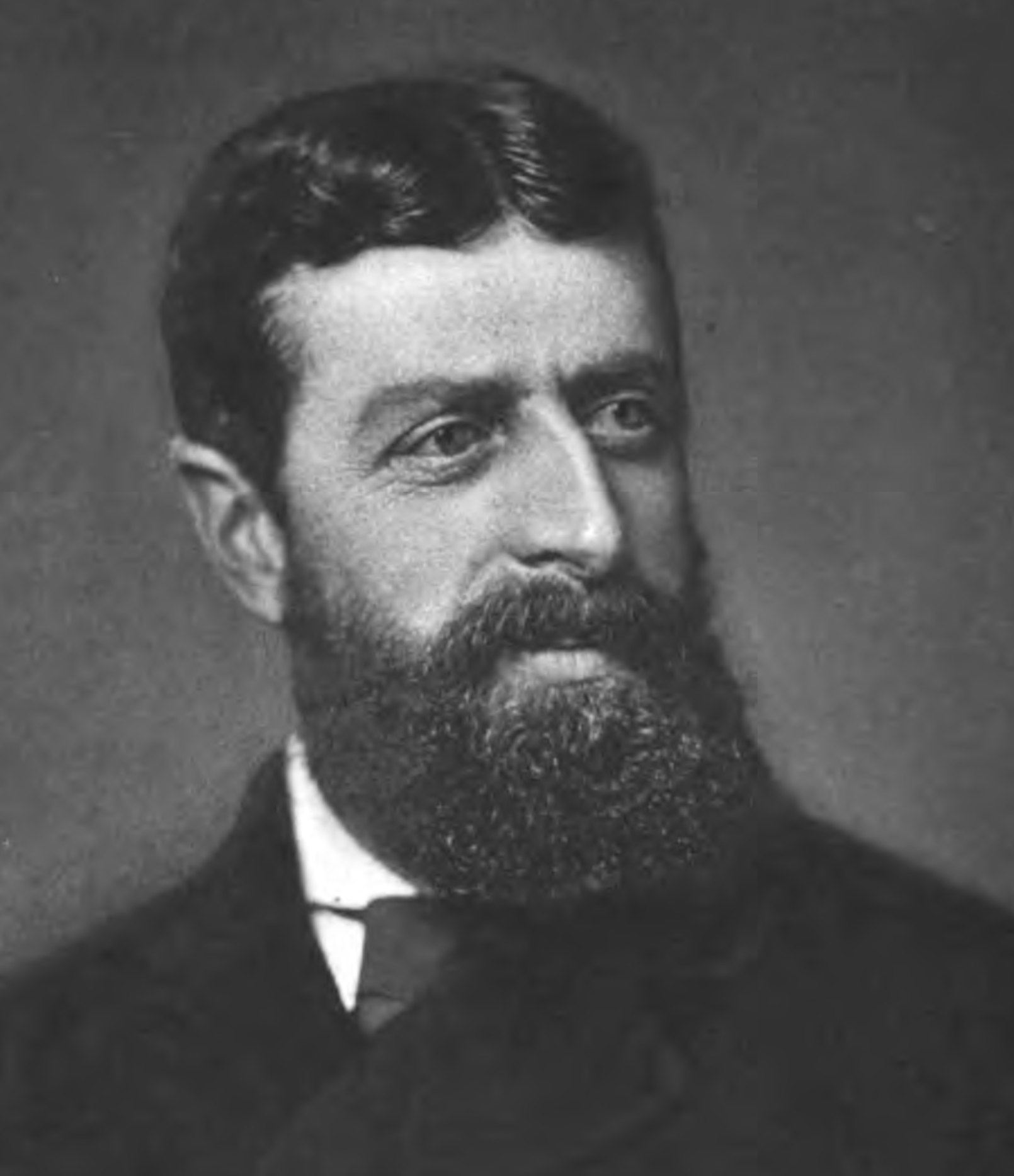
- Born: 10 June 1841; Eaton Square, London, England
- Died: 20 March 1897 (aged 55); Las Palmas, Canary Islands, Spain
- Education: Exeter College, Oxford
- Occupation: Banker
- Known for: Martins Bank
- Spouse: Victoria Woodhull (m. 1883)
- Relatives: Richard B. Martin (brother)
Association football career
Senior career*
Years	Team	Apps	(Gls)
1865–1870	Wanderers F.C.		
- * Club domestic league appearances and goals

John Biddulph Martin (10 June 1841 – 20 March 1897) was an English banker and statistician.

== Early life ==
Martin was born on 10 June 1841, in Eaton Square, London, the second son of Robert Martin, of Overbury Court, Tewkesbury. He was educated at Harrow School, matriculating at Exeter College, Oxford in 1860, and graduating B.A. there in 1862, M.A. in 1867.

== Banking career ==
Martin was a partner in the family business of Martins Bank from 1864.

== Publications ==
Martin's major work was "The Grasshopper" in Lombard Street, a history of Martins Bank. The bank was at one time the property of Sir Thomas Gresham, whose crest, the Grasshopper, the name commemorates.

His paper "Our Gold Coinage", 1882, helped enable the late 19th century reform of the gold currency. It was a statistical inquiry into its condition at the time, showing the depreciation of the coinage from 1817, the date when UK gold coinage was resumed after the Napoleonic Wars. It appeared in the Journal of the Bankers' Institute: to which, as well as to the Journal of the Royal Statistical Society, he was a frequent contributor. He was President of the Royal Statistical Society at the time of his death. His article on "The Evolution of our Banking System" in the Economic Journal for 1891 was noted for its insights.

== Sportsman ==
Martin played football for Wanderers F.C. between 1865 and 1870. He played for "London" in the historic London v Sheffield football match of 1866, scoring a goal and a touch down. At the time of his death, he was president of the London Athletic Club.

== Family ==
Martin's elder brother, Richard B. Martin, was a Member of Parliament for Droitwich from 1892 to 1906. In 1883, Martin married American suffragist Victoria Woodhull.

== Death ==
Martin died of pneumonia on 20 March 1897, at Las Palmas, Canary Islands. He was survived by his wife Victoria.

== Works ==
- Martin, John Biddulph (1 June 1874). "The Elections of 1868 and 1874". Journal of the Statistical Society of London. 37 (2): 193–230. doi:10.2307/2338721. JSTOR 2338721.
- n.a. [John Biddulph Martin] (December 1877). "Pelasgic Mykenæ". Blackwood's Edinburgh Magazine. cxxii (dccxlvi): 672–683.
- Martin, John Biddulph (1 September 1879). "On Some Effects of a Crisis on the Banking Interest". Journal of the Statistical Society of London. 42 (3): 663–708. doi:10.2307/2339053. JSTOR 2339053.
- Martin, John Biddulph (March 1880). "An Inquiry into the History, Functions, and Fluctuation of the Bank-Note Circulation in the United Kingdom, Continental Europe and the United States". Journal of the Institute of Bankers. 1: 273–336. hdl:2027/mdp.39015067147408.
- Martin, John Biddulph (June 1882). "Our Gold Coinage: an Inquiry into its Present Defective Condition, with a View to its Reform". Journal of the Institute of Bankers. 3 (4): 297–346. hdl:2027/mdp.39015067154164.
- Martin, John Biddulph (1 March 1884). "Electoral Statistics: A Review of the Working of our Representative System from 1832–1881, in view of Prospective Changes Therein". Journal of the Statistical Society of London. 47 (1): 75–124. doi:10.2307/2979212. hdl:2027/uiuo.ark:/13960/t4rj4sz8p. JSTOR 2979212.
- Martin, John Biddulph (1 April 1884). "Seigneuriage and Mint Charges". Journal of the Institute of Bankers. 5 (4): 171–186. hdl:2027/mdp.39015067154180.
- Martin, John Biddulph (1 September 1884). "Media of Exchange: Being Some Notes on the Precious Metals and Their Equivalents". Journal of the Statistical Society of London. 47 (3): 485–495. doi:10.2307/2979251. JSTOR 2979251.
- Martin, John Biddulph (1884). The Future of the United States. London: Blades, East and Blades. hdl:2027/nyp.33433089566735. OCLC 1063210825.
- Martin, John Biddulph (1 December 1886). ""Economic Science and Statistics." The Address of the President of Section F of the British Association, at the Fifty-Sixth Meeting, Held at Birmingham, in September, 1886". Journal of the Statistical Society of London. 49 (4): 736–754. doi:10.2307/2979166. JSTOR 2979166.
- Martin, John Biddulph (25 June 1887). "Hospital Sunday Fund". The British Medical Journal. 1 (1381): 1349. JSTOR 20212090.
- Martin, John Biddulph (April 1888). "Notes on Some Recorded Movements of Coin and Its Equivalent During Recent Years". Journal of the Institute of Bankers. ix (iv): 1–27. hdl:2027/uc1.b3011248.
- Martin, John Biddulph (1 September 1891). "The Evolution of our Banking System". The Economic Journal. 1 (3): 539–544. doi:10.2307/2956120. JSTOR 2956120.
- Martin, John Biddulph (1892). "The Grasshopper" in Lombard Street. London: Leadenhall Press. OCLC 1184168199.
- Martin, John Biddulph (1 December 1896). "On Some Developments of Statistical Research and Methods During Recent Years. The Inaugural Address of John Biddulph Martin, Esq., M.A., President of the Royal Statistical Society. Session 1896–97. Delivered 17th November, 1896". Journal of the Royal Statistical Society. 59 (4): 579–628. doi:10.2307/2979899. JSTOR 2979899.
