= James Blood =

American politician

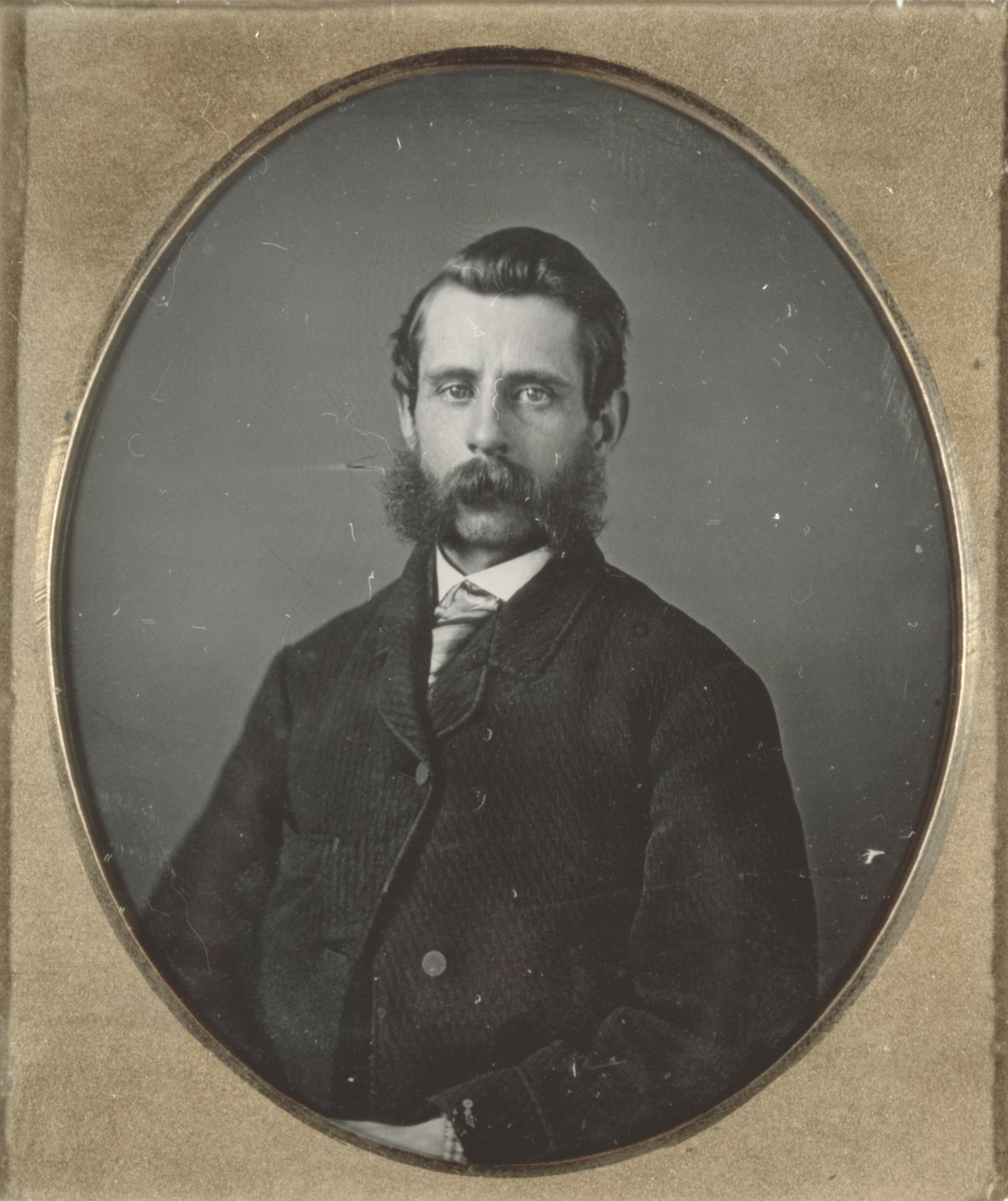
- Born: James Harvey Blood; December 29, 1833; Dudley, Massachusetts, U.S.
- Died: December 29, 1885 (aged 52); Akanten, Gold Coast
- Occupations: Union Army officer and politician
- Spouses: Mary Ann Clapp Harrington; Victoria Woodhull (c. 1865–1876); Isabell Morrill Fogg

James Harvey Blood (December 29, 1833 – December 29, 1885) was an American Union Army officer who was Commander of the 6th Missouri Infantry Regiment during the American Civil War. He was promoted from lieutenant colonel to colonel, and he was elected city auditor of St. Louis. He was the second husband of Victoria Woodhull, the 19th-century suffragist and activist who was the first woman to run as a candidate for president of the United States.

== Marriage to Victoria Woodhull ==
In April 1864, Victoria Claflin Woodhull was billing herself as a "spiritualistic physician" in St. Louis, Missouri. In the first session with Blood, she predicted their marriage, and he promptly proposed, even though he was still married to his first wife, Mary Ann Clapp Harrington. Woodhull was also married at the time. Once both became divorced, they left St. Louis in 1865, moving through Midwestern cities before reaching New York City in 1867. Mrs Woodhull, in denouncing the crusades that had provided her with national attention, abandoned Blood in 1876 to try to regain her respectability. His only public response was "The grandest woman in the world went back on me." They divorced later that year.

== Later life ==
Blood later married his third wife, Isabell Morrill Fogg, after divorcing Woodhull in 1876. He died in Akanten, Gold Coast, Africa while on a gold mining expedition, where he had struck gold. He died on his 52nd birthday.
