= 6th Missouri Infantry Regiment (Union) =

American Civil War Union Army unit

- Active: June 15, 1861, to August 17, 1865
- Country: United States
- Allegiance: Union
- Branch: Infantry
- Engagements: Siege of Corinth; Yazoo Pass Expedition; Battle of Chickasaw Bayou; Battle of Arkansas Post; Battle of Champion Hill; Siege of Vicksburg, May 19 & May 22 assaults Chattanooga campaign Battle of Missionary Ridge; Atlanta campaign Battle of Resaca; Battle of Dallas; Battle of New Hope Church; Battle of Allatoona; Battle of Kennesaw Mountain; Battle of Atlanta; Siege of Atlanta; Battle of Jonesboro; Battle of Lovejoy's Station; Sherman's March to the Sea; Carolinas campaign Battle of Bentonville

The 6th Missouri Infantry Regiment was an infantry regiment that served in the Union Army during the American Civil War.

== Service ==
The 6th Missouri Infantry Regiment was organized at St. Louis, Missouri June 15 - July 9, 1861, and mustered in for three years service.

The regiment was attached to Pilot Knob, Missouri, to September 1861. Fremont's Army of the West to January 1862. Department of the Missouri to April 1862. 1st Brigade, 5th. Division, Army of the Tennessee, to July 1862. 1st Brigade, 5th Division, District of Memphis, Tennessee, to November 1862. 1st Brigade, 5th Division, Right Wing, XIII Corps, Department of the Tennessee, to November 1862. 1st Brigade, 2nd Division, Right Wing, XIII Corps, to December 1862. 1st Brigade, 2nd Division, Sherman's Yazoo Expedition, to January 1863. 1st Brigade, 2nd Division, XV Corps, Army of the Tennessee, to July 1865.

The 6th Missouri Infantry mustered out of service on August 17, 1865.

== Detailed service ==
Ordered to Pilot Knob, Mo., July 19, 1861, and duty there until September. Moore's Mills August 29. Moved to Jefferson City, then to Tipton, Mo. Fremont's campaign against Springfield, Mo., October and November. Moved to Tipton and Lamine and guarded Pacific Railroad from Syracuse to Jefferson City until April 1862. Action at Sink Pole Woods March 23, 1862 (Company A). Expedition in Moniteau County and skirmish March 25–28 (Companies A & C). Sink Pole Woods April 20. Moved to Pittsburg Landing April 1862. Advance on and siege of Corinth, Miss., April 29-May 30. Coldwater, Miss., May 11. March to Memphis, Tenn., via Lagrange, Holly Springs, and Moscow June 3-July 21. Duty at Memphis until November. Expedition to Coldwater and Hernando, Miss., September 9–13. Grant's Central Mississippi Campaign November–December. "Tallahatchie March" November 26-December 12. Sherman's Yazoo Expedition December 20, 1862, to January 3, 1863. Chickasaw Bayou December 26–28. Chickasaw Bluff December 29. Expedition to Arkansas Post, Ark., January 3–10, 1863. Assault and capture of Fort Hindman, Arkansas Post, January 10–11. Moved to Young's Point, La., January 13–22, and duty there until March. Expedition to Rolling Fork via Muddy Steele's and Black Bayous and Deer Creek March 4–27. Demonstration on Haines and Drumgould's Bluffs April 29-May 2, Haines Bluff May 1. Moved to join army in rear of Vicksburg, Miss., via Richmond and Grand Gulf May 2–16. Battle of Champion Hill May 16. Siege of Vicksburg May 18-July 4. Assaults on Vicksburg May 19 and 22. Advance on Jackson, Miss., July 4–10. Siege of Jackson July 10–17. Brandin Station July 19. At Big Black until September 25. Moved to Memphis, then marched to Chattanooga, Tenn., September 25-November 21. Operations on Memphis & Charleston Railroad in Alabama October 20–29. Bear Creek, Tuscumbia, October 27. Chattanooga-Ringgold Campaign November 23–27. Brown's Ferry November 23. Foot of Missionary Ridge November 24. Tunnel Hill, Missionary Ridge, November 24–25. Pursuit to Graysville November 26–27. March to relief of Knoxville, Tenn., November 28-December 5. Expedition to Tellico Plains December 6–13. March to Chattanooga, Tenn., December 13–17; then to Bridgeport, Ala., December 19. Garrison duty in Alabama until May 1864. Atlanta Campaign May 1 to September 8. Demonstrations on Resaca May 8–13. Battle of Resaca May 14–15. Advance on Dallas May 18–25. Battles about Dallas, New Hope Church, and Allatoona Hills May 25-June 5. Operations about Marietta and against Kennesaw Mountain June 10-July 2. Bushy Mountain June 15–17. Assault on Kennesaw June 27. Nickajack Creek July 2–5. Chattahoochie River July 6–17. Battle of Atlanta July 22. Siege of Atlanta July 22-August 25. Ezra Chapel July 28. Hood's 2nd sortie. Flank movement on Jonesboro August 25–30. Battle of Jonesboro August 31-September 1. Lovejoy's Station September 2–6. Operations in northern Georgia and northern Alabama against Hood September 29-November 3. March to the sea November 15-December 10. Near Clinton November 21–23. Oconee River November 25. Statesboro December 3. Siege of Savannah December 10–21. Fort McAllister December 13. Campaign of the Carolinas January to April. Duck Branch, near Loper's Cross Roads, S.C., February 2. Salkehatchie Swamps February 3–5. South Edisto River February 9. North Edisto River February 12–13. Columbia February 16–17. Battle of Bentonville, N.C., March 20–21. Occupation of Goldsboro March 24. Advance on Raleigh April 10–14, Occupation of Raleigh April 14. Bennett's House April 26. Surrender of Johnston and his army. March to Washington, D.C., via Richmond, Va., April 29-May 19. Grand Review of the Armies May 24. Moved to Louisville, Ky., June. Duty there and at Little Rock, Ark., until August.

== Casualties ==
The regiment lost a total of 269 men during service; 4 officers and 80 enlisted men killed or mortally wounded, 3 officers and 182 enlisted men died of disease.

== Commanders ==
- Colonel James Harvey Blood
- Lieutenant Colonel Ira Boutell - commanded at the battle of Champion Hill
- Lieutenant Colonel Delos Van Deusen - commanded during the Carolinas Campaign

== Notable members ==
- Private Henry F. Frizzell, Company B - Medal of Honor — Participating in a diversionary "forlorn hope" attack on Confederate defenses, 22 May 1863.
- Private Joseph S. Labill, Company C - Medal of Honor — Participating in the same "forlorn hope."
- First Lieutenant George Henry Stockman, Company C - Medal of Honor — Participating in the same "forlorn hope."
- Private Joseph Wortick, Company A - Medal of Honor — Participating in the same "forlorn hope."

== See also ==
- Missouri Civil War Union units
- Missouri in the Civil War
