= Baron Tollemache =

Barony in the Peerage of the United Kingdom

Barony of Tollemache
- Blazon: Argent a fret sable
- Creation date: 11 January 1876
- Created by: Queen Victoria
- Peerage: Peerage of the United Kingdom
- First holder: John Tollemache
- Present holder: John Tollemache, 5th Baron
- Heir apparent: The Hon. Edward Tollemache
- Remainder to: the 1st Baron's heirs male of the body lawfully begotten
- Seat: Helmingham Hall
- Former seat: Peckforton Castle
- Motto: Confido Conquiesco (Latin for 'I trust and am content')

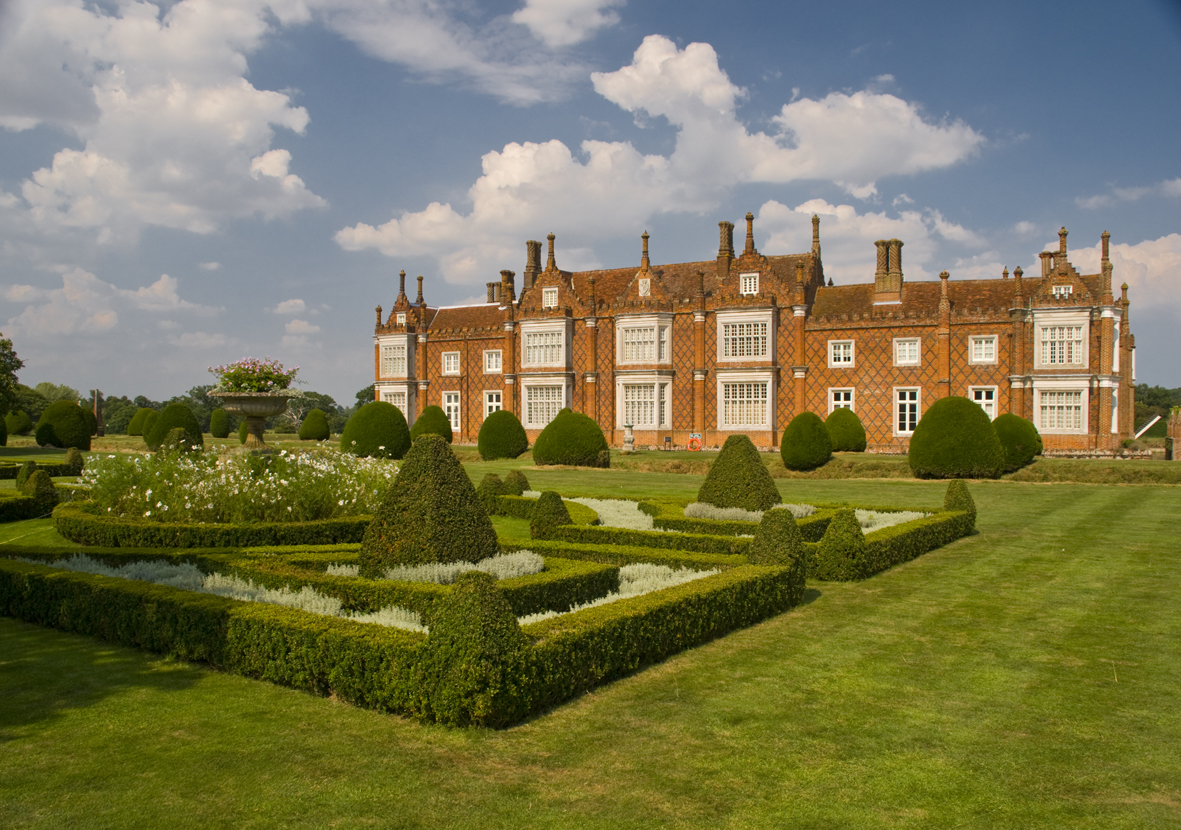
Helmingham Hall in Suffolk, the seat of the Tollemache family

Baron Tollemache, of Helmingham Hall near Ipswich in the County of Suffolk, is a title in the Peerage of the United Kingdom. The Tollemache family's surname and the title of the barony is pronounced /ˈtɒlmæʃ/ TOL-mash.

== History ==
The title was created in 1876 for John Tollemache, who had earlier represented Cheshire South and Cheshire West in the House of Commons as a Conservative. He was the son of Admiral of the Fleet John Halliday (who in 1821 assumed by Royal licence the surname and arms of Tollemache in lieu of Halliday), eldest son of Lady Jane Halliday, youngest daughter of Lionel Tollemache, 4th Earl of Dysart.

The first Baron was succeeded by his eldest son, the second Baron. He also sat as Conservative Member of Parliament for Cheshire West. On the death of his grandson, the third Baron, this line of the family failed, and the title passed to the late Baron's second cousin, the fourth Baron. He was the son of Major-General Edward Tollemache, son of the Hon. Hamilton James Tollemache, fourth son of the first Baron. As of 2017, the title is held by the fourth Baron's son, the fifth Baron, who succeeded in 1975. He was Lord Lieutenant of Suffolk from 2003 to 2014.

The actor Danny Dyer is distantly related to the family, through his 11-times great-grandmother, Anne Tollemache, which he discovered during an episode of BBC's Who Do You Think You Are?

The family seat is Helmingham Hall, near Helmingham in Suffolk.

== Barons Tollemache (1876) ==
- John Tollemache, 1st Baron Tollemache (1805–1890)
- Wilbraham Frederic Tollemache, 2nd Baron Tollemache (1832–1904)
  - The Honourable Lyonel Plantagenet Tollemache (1860–1902)
- Bentley Lyonel John Tollemache, 3rd Baron Tollemache (1883–1955)
- John Edward Hamilton Tollemache, 4th Baron Tollemache (1910–1975)
- Timothy John Edward Tollemache, 5th Baron Tollemache (b. 1939)

The heir apparent is the present holder's elder son, the Hon. Edward John Hugh Tollemache (b. 1976).
The heir apparent's heir apparent is his elder son, Ralph Timothy Jack Tollemache (b. 2010).

== Coat of arms ==
Coat of arms of Baron Tollemache
| Notes Coat of arms of the Tollemache family Coronet The coronet of a baron Crest A Horse's Head erased Argent between two Wings Or pellety Escutcheon Argent a Fret Sable Supporters On either side a Stag guardant proper gorged with a Collar flory counterflory Or Motto Confido Conquiesco (Latin for 'I trust and am content') |

== See also ==
- Earl of Dysart
- Peckforton Castle
- Tollemache baronets
- Tollemache Brewery
