= John Tollemache =

John Tollemache may refer to:

- John Tollemache, 1st Baron Tollemache (1805–1890), British member of parliament and landowner
- John Tollemache, 5th Baron Tollemache (born 1939), English peer and landowner
- John Manners Tollemache (c. 1768–1837), British gentleman and member of parliament
