= Henriette, Lady Abel Smith =

British lady-in-waiting (1914–2005)

Lady Abel Smith DCVO JP
- Born: Henriette Alice Cadogan; 6 June 1914; Hatherop, Gloucestershire, England
- Died: 3 May 2005 (aged 90); Cirencester, Gloucestershire, England
- Occupations: Lady-in-Waiting, Justice of the Peace
- Spouses: Sir Anthony Palmer, 4th Baronet (m. 1939; died 1941) Sir Alexander Abel Smith (m. 1953; died 1980)
- Children: 4; including Sir Mark Palmer, 5th Baronet
- Relatives: Henry Cadogan, 4th Earl Cadogan (great-grandfather); Stafford Howard (grandfather)

Dame Henriette Alice, Lady Abel Smith, DCVO, JP (née Cadogan; 6 June 1914 – 3 May 2005) was a lady-in-waiting to Queen Elizabeth II from 1949 to 1987.

== Early life ==
Henriette was born at Hatherop Castle in Gloucestershire, the daughter of Commander Francis Charles Cadogan, a Royal Navy officer of Quenington Old Rectory, Cirencester, (a grandson of Henry Charles Cadogan, 4th Earl Cadogan) by his wife Ruth Evelyn Howard, a daughter of Sir Edward Stafford Howard, a great-nephew of Bernard Howard, 12th Duke of Norfolk.

== Career ==
She held the office of a Lady-in-Waiting to Queen Elizabeth II from 1949 to 1987. In 1987 she became an Extra Lady-in-Waiting. She served as a Justice of the Peace (JP) for Tunbridge Wells in 1955, and for Gloucestershire in 1971. She was invested as a Commander of the Royal Victorian Order in the 1964 New Year Honours, and was elevated to Dame Commander of the Royal Victorian Order in 1977.

== Marriages and issue ==
Henriette married twice. Firstly on 4 September 1939, she married Major Sir Anthony Frederick Mark Palmer, 4th Baronet. They had a son and a daughter:

- Antonia Mary Palmer (born 2 August 1940), wife of Lord Christopher John Thynne, younger brother of Alexander Thynn, 7th Marquess of Bath.
- Sir Mark Palmer, 5th Baronet (born 1941), First Page of Honour to the Queen 1956–1959.

In 1941, her husband was killed in the Second World War.

Secondly on 17 February 1953, she married Brigadier Sir Alexander Abel Smith (1904–1980), the younger brother of Sir Henry Abel Smith (who in 1931 had married into the Royal Family). They also had a son and a daughter:

- Christopher Abel Smith (born 28 June 1954), a godson of Queen Elizabeth II and First Page of Honour to the Queen 1967–1970.
- Juliet Sarah Abel Smith (born 26 August 1955)

Abel Smith died on 3 May 2005 at The Garden House, Cirencester, Gloucestershire, aged 90.

== Awards ==
Country	Date	Appointment	Ribbon	Post-nominal letters	Notes
United Kingdom	31 December 1963	Commander of the Royal Victorian Order		CVO	Promoted to DCVO in 1977
United Kingdom	1977	Dame Commander of the Royal Victorian Order		DCVO	
United Kingdom	2 June 1953	Queen Elizabeth II Coronation Medal			
United Kingdom	6 February 1977	Queen Elizabeth II Silver Jubilee Medal			
United Kingdom	6 February 2002	Queen Elizabeth II Golden Jubilee Medal			

== Sources ==
- Charles Mosley, editor, Burke's Peerage, Baronetage & Knightage, 107th edition, 3 volumes (Wilmington, Delaware: Burke's Peerage (Genealogical Books) Ltd, 2003), volume 1, page 2 and 637.
- Michael Rhodes, "re: Ernest Fawbert Collection" e-mail message to Darryl Roger Lundy, 8 February.
- Notices, The Daily Telegraph, London, 6 June 2005.
