= General Torrens =

General Torrens may refer to:

- Arthur Wellesley Torrens (1809–1855), British Army major general
- Henry Torrens (British Army officer, born 1833) (1833–1889), British Army lieutenant general
- Henry Torrens (British Army officer, born 1779) (1779–1828), British Army major general
