= Page of Honour =

UK Royal Household ceremonial position

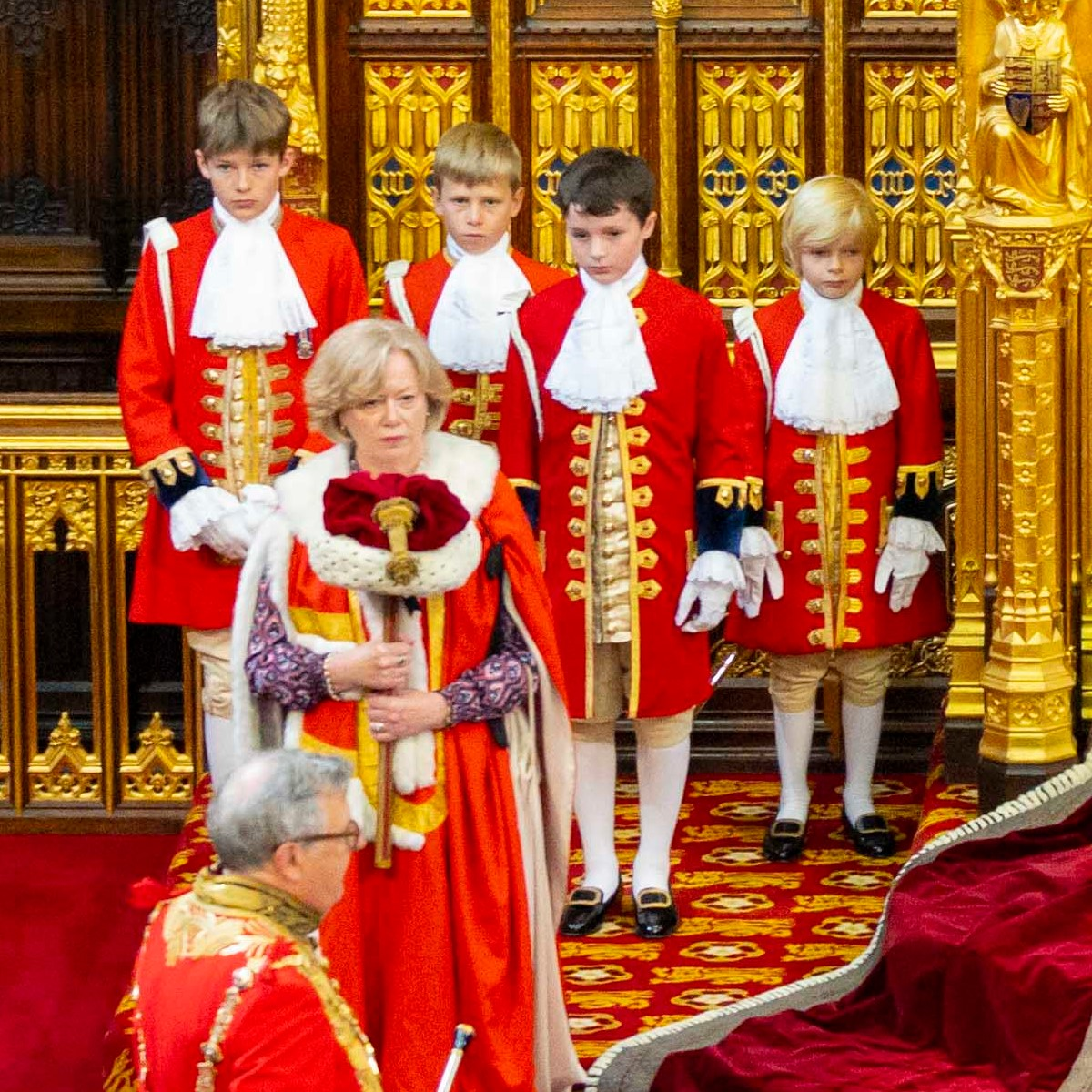
Pages of Honour in the House of Lords at the 2024 State Opening of Parliament

A Page of Honour is a ceremonial position in the Royal Household of the Sovereign of the United Kingdom. It requires attendance on state occasions, but does not now involve the daily duties which were once attached to the office of page. The only physical activity involved is usually carrying the long train of the Sovereign's robes. This position is distinct from that of a page in the Royal Household, which is the senior rank of uniformed staff.

Pages of Honour participate in major ceremonies involving the British monarch, including coronations and the State Opening of Parliament. It is usually a distinction granted to teenage sons of members of the nobility and gentry, and especially of senior members of the Royal Household.

== Livery ==
Pages of Honour in England wear a scarlet frock coat with gold trimmings, a white satin waistcoat, white breeches and hose, white gloves, black buckled shoes and a lace cravat and ruffles. A sword is also worn with the outfit and a feathered three-cornered hat is provided. In Scotland the outfit is identical, but in green rather than scarlet (as seen periodically at the Thistle Service in Edinburgh). In Ireland, when Pages of Honour were attendant upon the King, Pages of Honour wore exactly the same uniform as at the English Court, except that the colour was St. Patrick's blue with silver lace.

At coronations, the peers who carry regalia in the procession (and others with particular roles in the service) were expected to have their own pages in attendance. These pages are directed to wear "the same pattern of clothes as the Pages of Honour wear, but of the Livery colour of the Lords they attend... [except that] ...the Royal liveries being scarlet and gold, the use of this combination of colours is restricted to the Pages of Honour, and in the case of a Peer whose colours are scarlet and gold, for scarlet some variant, such as murrey or claret, should be used."

== Pages of Honour by monarch ==
=== Charles II ===
- 1661–1662: Bevil Skelton
- 1661–1669: John Napier
- 1662–1668: Sidney Godolphin
- 1664–1665: Rupert Dillon
- 1665–1671?: Thomas Felton
- 1668–1678: John Berkeley
- 1668–1676: William Legge
- 1670: Charles Wyndham
- 1671–1685: Robert Killigrew
- 1671–1685: Aubrey Porter
- 1673–1678: John Prideaux
- 1674–1678: Henry Wroth
- 1678–1685: Thomas Pulteney
- 1680–1685: Sutton Oglethorpe
- 1681–1685: Charles Skelton

=== James II ===
- 1685: Thomas Windsor
- 1685: Reynold Graham
- 1685: James Levinston

=== William III ===
First Page of Honour

- 1689–1692?: Nicholas Needham
- 1692–1697: Carew Rawleigh
- 1697–1702: Robert Rich

Second Page of Honour

- 1689–1690: Arnold van Keppel
- 1690–1693?: Ernest Henry Ittersum
- 1695–1702: Thomas Harrison

Third Page of Honour

- 1689–1693?: Charles Dormer
- 1697–1702: William Colt

Fourth Page of Honour

- 1690–1693: Matthew Harvey
- 1693–1697: George Feilding
- 1697–1702: Allan Wentworth

John Brockhuisen appears in the post-mortem accounts of the Board of Green Cloth as a page of honour to William III, but this may be an error, as he appears elsewhere as a pensioner after serving as Queen Mary's page of honour.

=== Anne ===
First Page of Honour

- 1702–1707: The Hon. John Egerton
- 1707–1714: The Hon. Richard Arundell

Second Page of Honour

- 1702–1709: Robert Blount
- 1709–1714: John Mordaunt

Third Page of Honour

- 1702–1708: John Gough
- 1708–1712: Charles Hedges
- 1712–1714: Thomas Murray

Fourth Page of Honour

- 1702–1710: The Hon. Henry Berkeley
- 1710–1714: John Hampden

=== George I ===
First Page of Honour

- 1714–1727: Guildford Killigrew

Second Page of Honour

- 1714–1718: John Mordaunt
- 1718–1721: Emanuel Howe
- 1721–1727: Archibald Carmichael

Third Page of Honour

- 1714–1724: Thomas Murray
- 1724–1727: Sir William Irby, Bt

Fourth Page of Honour

- 1714–1724: Thomas Bludworth
- 1724–1727: Walter Villiers
- 1727: Henry Newton

=== George II ===
First Page of Honour

- 1727–1734: John FitzWilliam
- 1734–1739: Philip Roberts
- 1739–1745: Charles Chamberlayne
- 1745–1748: William Tryon
- 1748–1753: John Jenkinson
- 1753–1760: The Hon. John Byng

Second Page of Honour

- 1727–1731: Henry Panton
- 1731–1735: Henry d'Arcy
- 1735–1739: John Ashburnham
- 1739–1744: Bluett Wallop
- 1744–1747: The Hon. William Howe
- 1747–1751: The Hon. George West
- 1751–1755: William Feilding
- 1755–1760: The Hon. Henry Monckton

Third Page of Honour

- 1727–1731: Sir William Irby, Bt
- 1731–1737: The Hon. John Boscawen
- 1737–1740: Charles Lee
- 1740–1746: Sandys Mill
- 1746–1747: The Hon. George Bennet
- 1747–1752: Thomas Brudenell
- 1752–1757: William Middleton
- 1757–1760: Henry Wallop

Fourth Page of Honour

- 1727–1731: Archibald Carmichael
- 1731–1737: Thomas Style
- 1737–1741: The Hon. Charles Roper
- 1741–1746: The Hon. William Keppel
- 1746–1748: Charles Knollis
- 1748–1753: Harvey Smith
- 1753–1759: James Bathurst
- 1759–1760: John Wrottesley

=== George III ===
First Page of Honour

- 1760–1762: James Hamilton
- 1762–1769: Henry Monckton
- 1769–1777: Henry Greville
- 1777–1784: Henry Durell
- 1784–1793: John Neville
- 1793–1795: Henry Wilson
- 1795–1803: Charles Wilson
- 1803–1812: Charles Greville
- 1812–1815: Frederick Turner
- 1816–1818: John Bloomfield
- 1818–1820: Arthur Richard Wellesley

Second Page of Honour

- 1760–1764: Henry Vernon
- 1764–1772: Thomas Thoroton
- 1772–1777: Richard Barrington
- 1777–1782: Henry Hall
- 1782–1794: Charles West
- 1794–1802: George Dashwood
- 1802–1803: The Hon. Fitzroy Stanhope
- 1803–1808: vacant
- 1808–1809: Henry Buckley
- 1809–1815: Philip Stanhope
- 1816–1820: The Hon. William Graves

Third Page of Honour

- 1760–1761: The Hon. Edmund Boyle
- 1761–1768: John Manners
- 1768–1782: Francis Mackenzie
- 1782–1789: John Murray
- 1789–1794: Charles Jenkinson
- 1794–1800: William Dansey
- 1800–1804: The Hon. Edward Irby
- 1804–1811: Henry Somerset
- 1812–1817: Charles Arbuthnot
- 1817–1820: Frederick Paget

Fourth Page of Honour

- 1760–1768: Doddington Egerton
- 1768–1776: Francis Chaplin
- 1776–1781: William Paul de Cerjat
- 1781–1786: Kenneth Howard
- 1786–1791: James Cockburn
- 1791–1794: Edward Draper
- 1794–1800: Charles Parker
- 1800–1804: William Wynyard
- 1804–1810: Richard Cumberland
- 1810–1816: Henry Murray
- 1816–1819: Frederick Culling–Smith
- 1819–1820: Arthur Torrens

Fifth Page of Honour

- 1760–1761: John Wrottesley
- 1773–1781: George Bristow
- 1781–1782: John Murray

=== George IV ===
First Page of Honour

- 1820–1821: Arthur Richard Wellesley
- 1821–1826: Lord Frederick Paulet
- 1826–1828: William Hervey-Bathurst
- 1828–1830: Henry d'Aguilar

Second Page of Honour

- 1820–1823: Frederick Paget
- 1823–1826: William Burton
- 1826–1830: Frederick Hamilton

Third Page of Honour

- 1820–1824: Charles Bagot
- 1824–1830: Arthur William FitzRoy Somerset

Fourth Page of Honour

- 1820–1825: Arthur Torrens
- 1825–1830: Joseph Hudson

=== William IV ===
First Page of Honour

- 1830–1835: Henry d'Aguilar
- 1835–1837: Charles Ellice

Second Page of Honour

- 1830–1831: Frederick Hamilton
- 1831–1837: Frederick Stephenson

Third Page of Honour

- 1830–1832: Arthur Somerset
- 1832–1837: Lord Hay

Fourth Page of Honour

- 1830: Joseph Hudson
- 1830–1837: The Hon. Adolphus Graves
- 1837: James Cowell

=== Victoria ===
First Page of Honour

- 1837–1839: Charles Ellice
- 1839–1844: Charles Wemyss
- 1844–1852: George Gordon
- 1852–1859: Henry Farquharson
- 1859–1862: Edmund Boyle
- 1862–1869: The Hon. Spencer Jocelyn
- 1869–1871: The Hon. Frederick Bruce
- 1871–1876: Victor Biddulph
- 1876–1881: The Hon. Victor Spencer
- 1881–1884: Percy Cust
- 1884–1890: Eric Thesiger
- 1890–1894: The Hon. Maurice Drummond
- 1894–1901: Josslyn Egerton
- 1901–1901: John Bigge

Second Page of Honour

- 1837–1840: George Cavendish
- 1840–1847: Henry Byng
- 1847–1853: Alfred Crofton
- 1853–1861: Charles Phipps
- 1861–1867: Arthur Paget
- 1867–1874: George Grey
- 1874–1877: Laurence Drummond
- 1877–1882: Albert Wellesley
- 1882–1887: Arthur Ponsonby
- 1887–1892: Victor Wellesley
- 1892–1895: Albert Clarke
- 1895–1899: The Hon. John Henniker–Major
- 1899–1901: The Viscount Torrington

Third Page of Honour

- 1837–1839: Lord Kilmarnock
- 1839–1841: The Hon. Adolphus Chichester
- 1841–1856: Archibald Stuart-Wortley
- 1856–1862: Viscount Cuffe Castle
- 1862–1868: The Hon. Arthur Lyttleton
- 1868–1874: The Hon. George Somerset
- 1874–1879: Count Edward Gleichen
- 1879–1883: Frederic Kerr
- 1883–1893: Gerald Ellis
- 1893: Arthur Wood
- 1893–1896: Sir Albert Seymour, Bt.
- 1896–1901: The Hon. Ivan Hay

Fourth Page of Honour

- 1837–1840: James Cowell
- 1840–1845: Herbert Wilson
- 1845–1852: William Forbes
- 1852–1859: George Macpherson
- 1859–1866: Henry Loftus
- 1866–1870: The Hon. Frederick Stopford
- 1870–1876: Arthur Hardinge
- 1876–1877: George Macdonald
- 1877–1881: The Hon. Francis Hay
- 1881–1883: George Byng
- 1883–1886: The Hon. Edward FitzRoy
- 1886–1890: Cyril Stopford
- 1890–1895: Geoffrey Stewart
- 1895–1897: Alexander Wood
- 1897–1901: Harold Festing

=== Edward VII ===
First Page of Honour

- 1901–1904: John Bigge (Note: Son of Sir Arthur Bigge.)
- 1904–1910: The Hon. Edward Knollys

Second Page of Honour

- 1901–1903: The Viscount Torrington
- 1903–1908: Donald Davidson (Note: Son of Leslie Davidson and grandson of William Keppel, 7th Earl of Albemarle.)
- 1908–1910: Anthony Lowther

Third Page of Honour

- 1901: The Hon. Ivan Josslyn Hay (Note: Son of Charles Hay, 20th Earl of Erroll.)
- 1901–1907: The Hon. Victor Spencer (Note: Son of Victor Spencer, 1st Viscount Churchill.)
- 1907–1910: George Lane

Fourth Page of Honour

- 1901–1902: Harold Festing
- 1902–1906: Nigel Legge (Note: Son of Sir Henry Legge.)
- 1906–1908: Edward Hardinge (Note: Son of Charles Hardinge, 1st Baron Hardinge of Penshurst.)
- 1908–1910: Walter Campbell (Note: Son of Sir Walter Douglas Somerset Campbell.)

=== George V ===
First Page of Honour

- 1910–1911: The Hon. Edward Knollys
- 1911–1917: Edward Reid
- 1917–1921: Iain Murray (Note: Son of Sir Malcolm Donald Murray.)
- 1921–1924: The Earl Erne
- 1924–1927: Allan Mackenzie (Note: Grandson of Francis Knollys, 1st Viscount Knollys.)
- 1927–1932: Alfred Hesketh-Prichard
- 1932–1936: Patrick Crichton (Note: Son of the Hon. George Crichton.)

Second Page of Honour

- 1910–1913: Anthony Lowther
- 1913–1916: The Hon. Thomas Brand
- 1916–1919: Edward Ponsonby
- 1919–1925: George Godfrey-Faussett (Note: Son of Bryan Godfrey-Faussett.)
- 1925–1932: Neville Wigram
- 1932–1935: Colin Mackenzie
- 1935–1936: The Lord Herschell

Third Page of Honour

- 1910: George Lane
- 1910–1914: Victor Harbord (Note: Son of the Hon. Charles Harbord.)
- 1914–1917: Gerald Lloyd Verney
- 1917–1919: Richard Dawnay (Note: Son of the Hon. John Dawnay.)
- 1919–1923: Henry Hunloke
- 1923–1927: Michael Adeane
- 1927–1931: Jock Colville
- 1931–1935: Viscount Errington
- 1935–1936: George Seymour

Fourth Page of Honour

- 1910–1913: Walter Campbell (Note: Son of Sir Walter Douglas Somerset Campbell.)
- 1913–1915: Assheton Curzon-Howe (Note: Son of Sir Assheton Curzon-Howe.)
- 1915–1917: Francis Stonor (Note: Great-grandson of Thomas Stonor, 3rd Baron Camoys.)
- 1917–1921: Guy Dugdale (Note: Grandson of George Greville, 4th Earl of Warwick.)
- 1921–1924: George Gordon-Lennox
- 1924–1930: Harry Legge-Bourke
- 1930–1933: Douglas Gordon (Note: Great-grandson of Charles Gordon, 10th Marquess of Huntly.)
- 1933–1936: George Hardinge (Note: Son of the Hon. Alec Hardinge.)

=== Edward VIII ===
First Page of Honour

- 1936: Patrick Crichton (Note: Son of the Hon. George Crichton.)

Second Page of Honour

- 1936: The Lord Herschell

Third Page of Honour

- 1936: George Seymour

Fourth Page of Honour

- 1936: George Hardinge (Note: Son of the Hon. Alec Hardinge.)

=== George VI ===
First Page of Honour

- 1936–1940: The Hon. Robert Eliot (Note: Son of Lord Eliot.)
- 1940–1948: None due to the Second World War
- 1948–1950: Lord Hyde
- 1950–1952: Charles Wilson (Note: Son of the Hon. Ben Wilson.)
- 1952: The Earl Erne

Second Page of Honour

- 1936–1940: The Lord Herschell
- 1940–1947: None due to the Second World War
- 1947–1951: James Ogilvy (Note: Son of David Ogilvy, 12th Earl of Airlie.)
- 1951–1952: Jonathan Peel (Note: Grandson of William Vanneck, 5th Baron Huntingfield.)

Third Page of Honour

- 1936–1940: George Seymour
- 1940–1946: None due to the Second World War
- 1946–1949: Bernard Gordon Lennox
- 1949–1952: Henry Seymour (Note: Grandson of James Hamilton, 3rd Duke of Abercorn.)

Fourth Page of Honour

- 1936–1938: George Hardinge (Note: Son of the Hon. Alec Hardinge.)
- 1938–1939: David Stuart (Note: Son of James Stuart.)
- 1939–1946: None due to the Second World War
- 1946–1950: George Paynter (Note: Son of Sir George Paynter.)
- 1950–1952: Michael Anson (Note: Son of Lady Clodagh Anson.)

=== Elizabeth II ===
First Page of Honour

- 1952–1954: The Earl Erne
- 1954–1956: The Hon. Anthony Tryon (Note: Son of Charles Tryon, 2nd Baron Tryon.)
- 1956–1959: Sir Mark Palmer, 5th Baronet
- 1959–1962: The Hon. Julian Hardinge (Note: Son of George Hardinge, Baron Hardinge of Penshurst.)
- 1962–1964: Earl of Lewes (Note: Son of John Nevill, 5th Marquess of Abergavenny.)
- 1964–1965: Lord Scrymgeour
- 1965–1967: Douglas Gordon (Note: Son of Lord Adam Gordon.)
- 1967–1970: Christopher Abel Smith (Note: Son of Sir Alexander Abel Smith and Lady Abel Smith, a lady-in-waiting to the Queen, and half-brother of Sir Mark Palmer, 5th Baronet, First Page of Honour 1956–1959.)
- 1970–1973: Louis Greig (Note: Son of Sir Carron Greig.)
- 1973–1976: Lord Leveson
- 1976–1978: John Ponsonby (Note: Son of Sir Ashley Ponsonby, 2nd Baronet.)
- 1979–1980: The Hon. Thomas Coke
- 1981–1983: James Basset
- 1983–1986: The Hon. Edward Cecil (Note: Son of Viscount Cecil.)
- 1986–1988: Benjamin Hamilton (Note: Son of the Hon. James Hamilton.)
- 1988–1990: The Hon. Edward Tollemache
- 1991–1994: Edward Janvrin
- 1994–1996: The Hon. Simon Ramsay (Note: Son of Lord Ramsay.)
- 1996–1999: Lord Eskdaill (Note: Son of Earl of Dalkeith.)
- 1999–2002: Lord Maltravers
- 2002–2004: Archibald Young (Note: Grandson of Sir Blair Stewart-Wilson.)
- 2004–2008: George FitzRoy (Note: Grandson of Hugh FitzRoy, 11th Duke of Grafton.)
- 2008–2012: Jack Soames (Note: Son of the Hon. Rupert Soames.)
- 2012–2015: The Hon. Charles Armstrong-Jones (Note: Son of Viscount Linley.)
- 2015: Lachlan Legge-Bourke (Note: Great-grandson of Sir Harry Legge-Bourke.)

Second Page of Honour

- 1952–1954: Jonathan Peel (Note: Grandson of William Vanneck, 5th Baron Huntingfield.)
- 1954–1956: Edward Adeane
- 1956–1957: Duncan Davidson
- 1957–1958: Andrew Gordon (Note: Great-great-grandson of Charles Gordon, 10th Marquess of Huntly.)
- 1960–1962: David Hughes-Wake-Walker (Note: Grandson of Albert Spencer, 7th Earl Spencer.)
- 1962–1963: Viscount Ipswich
- 1963–1964: Heneage Legge-Bourke (Note: Son of Sir Harry Legge-Bourke.)
- 1964–1966: Christopher Tennant (Note: Son of Sir Iain Tennant.)
- 1966–1968: The Hon. Harry Fane (Note: Son of David Fane, 15th Earl of Westmorland.)
- 1968–1969: John Maudslay
- 1969–1971: The Hon. David Hicks-Beach (Note: Son of Michael Hicks Beach, 2nd Earl St Aldwyn.)
- 1971–1973: Simon Rhodes (Note: Son of Denys Rhodes and the Hon. Margaret Elphinstone.)
- 1973–1974: David Bland (Note: Son of Sir Simon Bland.)
- 1974–1976: Earl of Rocksavage
- 1976–1979: Charles Loyd (Note: Son of Sir Charles Loyd.)
- 1979–1981: Viscount Carlow
- 1981–1983: Marquess of Lorne
- 1983–1984: The Hon. Hugh Crossley
- 1984–1988: Malcolm Maclean (Note: Son of the Hon. Lachlan Maclean.)
- 1988–1991: The Hon. Charles Tryon (Note: Son of Anthony Tryon, 3rd Baron Tryon.)
- 1991–1995: James Bowes-Lyon (Note: Great-great-great-grandson of Claude Bowes-Lyon, 13th Earl of Strathmore and Kinghorne, and grandson of Sir Jock Colville.)
- 1995–1997: The Hon. William Vestey (Note: Son of Samuel Vestey, 3rd Baron Vestey.)
- 1997–2000: Lord Dunglass (Note: Son of David Douglas-Home, 15th Earl of Home.)
- 2000–2004: The Hon. John Bowes-Lyon (Note: Son of Michael Bowes-Lyon, 18th Earl of Strathmore and Kinghorne.)
- 2004–2008: Viscount Garnock
- 2008–2012: Lord Stanley (Note: Son of Edward Stanley, 19th Earl of Derby.)
- 2012–2015: Viscount Aithrie (Note: Grandson of Adrian Hope, 4th Marquess of Linlithgow.)
- 2015–2019: The Hon. Augustus Stanhope (Note: Grandson of Charles Stanhope, 12th Earl of Harrington.)
- 2019–2022: Lord Claud Hamilton (Note: Grandson of James Hamilton, 5th Duke of Abercorn.)

Third Page of Honour

- 1952–1953: Henry Seymour (Note: Grandson of James Hamilton, 3rd Duke of Abercorn.)
- 1953–1955: Viscount Carlow
- 1955–1956: John Aird
- 1956–1958: Lord Ardee
- 1958–1961: Guy Nevill (Note: Grandson of Lord Rupert Nevill.)
- 1961–1964: David Penn
- 1964–1966: Edward Hay (Note: Son of Lady Margaret Hay.)
- 1966–1969: Nicholas Bacon
- 1969–1973: The Hon. George Herbert
- 1973–1975: Napier Marten
- 1975–1976: James Hussey (Note: Son of Marmaduke Hussey and Lady Susan Hussey.)
- 1976–1978: William Oswald (Note: Son of Michael Oswald.)
- 1978–1979: John Heseltine
- 1979–1981: James Maudslay
- 1981–1984: Guy Russell (Note: Great-great-grandson of Odo Russell, 1st Baron Ampthill.)
- 1984–1987: Harry Legge-Bourke (Note: Grandson of Sir Harry Legge-Bourke.)
- 1987–1989: The Hon. Robert Montgomerie (Note: Son of Archibald Montgomerie, 18th Earl of Eglinton.)
- 1989–1992: Rowley Baring (Note: Grandson of Rowland Baring, 3rd Earl of Cromer.)
- 1992–1995: Rory Penn (Note: Grandson of Timothy Colman.)
- 1995–1998: Thomas Howard
- 1998–2001: Viscount Chewton (Note: Son of James Waldegrave, 13th Earl Waldegrave.)
- 2001–2004: Viscount Garnock
- 2005–2008: Arthur Hussey (Note: Grandson of Marmaduke Hussey, Baron Hussey of North Bradley and Lady Susan Hussey.)
- 2008–2009: The Hon. Michael Ogilvy (Note: Grandson of David Ogilvy, 13th Earl of Airlie.)
- 2009–2015: Arthur Chatto (Note: Son of Daniel Chatto and Lady Sarah Chatto.)
- 2015–2018: Marquess of Lorne (Note: Son of Torquhil Campbell, 13th Duke of Argyll.)
- 2018–2022: Robert Bruce (Note: Son of the Hon. Adam Bruce.)

Fourth Page of Honour

- 1952–1953: Michael Anson (Note: Son of Lady Clodagh Anson.)
- 1953–1956: The Hon. Simon Scott (Note: Son of John Scott, 4th Earl of Eldon.)
- 1956–1957: Earl of Shelburne
- 1957–1959: Oliver Russell (Note: Son of Sir Guy Russell.)
- 1959–1962: Charles Strachey
- 1962–1964: Simon Rasch
- 1964–1966: Richard Ford (Note: Son of Sir Edward Ford.)
- 1966–1968: James Colville (Note: Grandson of Sir Piers Legh, Master of the Household 1941–1953.)
- 1968–1971: Alexander Colville (Note: Son of Sir Jock Colville.)
- 1971–1974: Lord Ogilvy
- 1974–1977: Edward Gordon Lennox (Note: Son of Bernard Gordon Lennox.)
- 1977–1979: Viscount Althorp
- 1979–1980: The Hon. Tyrone Plunket (Note: Son of Robin Plunket, 8th Baron Plunket.)
- 1980–1982: Richard Lytton-Cobbold (Note: Son of the Hon. David Lytton Cobbold.)
- 1982–1984: Marquess of Hamilton (Note: Son of James Hamilton, 5th Duke of Abercorn.)
- 1984–1988: Piers Blewitt
- 1988–1990: Lord Hyde
- 1990–1993: The Hon. Alexander Trenchard (Note: Son of Hugh Trenchard, 3rd Viscount Trenchard.)
- 1993–1996: The Hon. Edward Lowther (Note: Son of Nicholas Lowther, 2nd Viscount Ullswater.)
- 1996–1998: Earl Percy
- 1998–2003: Lord Carnegie (Note: Son of Earl of Southesk.)
- 2003–2006: Alexander Fraser, Master of Saltoun (Note: Son of Katharine Fraser, 22nd Lady Saltoun.)
- 2006–2008: Henry Naylor (Note: Grandson of Barry Maxwell, 12th Baron Farnham.)
- 2008–2012: Andrew Leeming (Note: Grandson of Fergus Bowes-Lyon, 17th Earl of Strathmore and Kinghorne.)
- 2012–2016: Hugo Bertie (Note: Great-great-grandson of Montagu Bertie, 7th Earl of Abingdon, of John Crichton-Stuart, 4th Marquess of Bute, and of Sidney Elphinstone, 16th Lord Elphinstone.)
- 2016–2018: Thomas Hallé
- 2018–2022: Max Bowen

=== Charles III ===
The pages of honour at the 2023 coronation were:

- Prince George of Wales
- Lord Oliver Cholmondeley (Note: Son of David Cholmondeley, 7th Marquess of Cholmondeley.)
- Nicholas Barclay (Note: Grandson of Sarah Troughton.)
- Ralph Tollemache (Note: Son of the Hon. Edward Tollemache.)

First Page of Honour

- 2023: Nicholas Barclay
- 2024: The Hon. Guy Tryon (Note: Son of Charles Tryon, 4th Baron Tryon.)
- 2026: The Hon. William Sackville (Note: Son of William Sackville, Lord Buckhurst.)

Second Page of Honour

- 2023: Ralph Tollemache
- 2024: The Hon. William Sackville
- 2026: Charles van Cutsem (Note: Grandson of Hugh van Cutsem.)

Third Page of Honour

- 2023: Charles van Cutsem
- 2024–2026: The Hon. Alfred Wellesley (Note: Son of Arthur Wellesley, Earl of Mornington.)

Fourth Page of Honour

- 2023: Lord Oliver Cholmondeley
- 2024: Ralph Tollemache
- 2026: The Hon. Guy Tryon

== Gallery ==
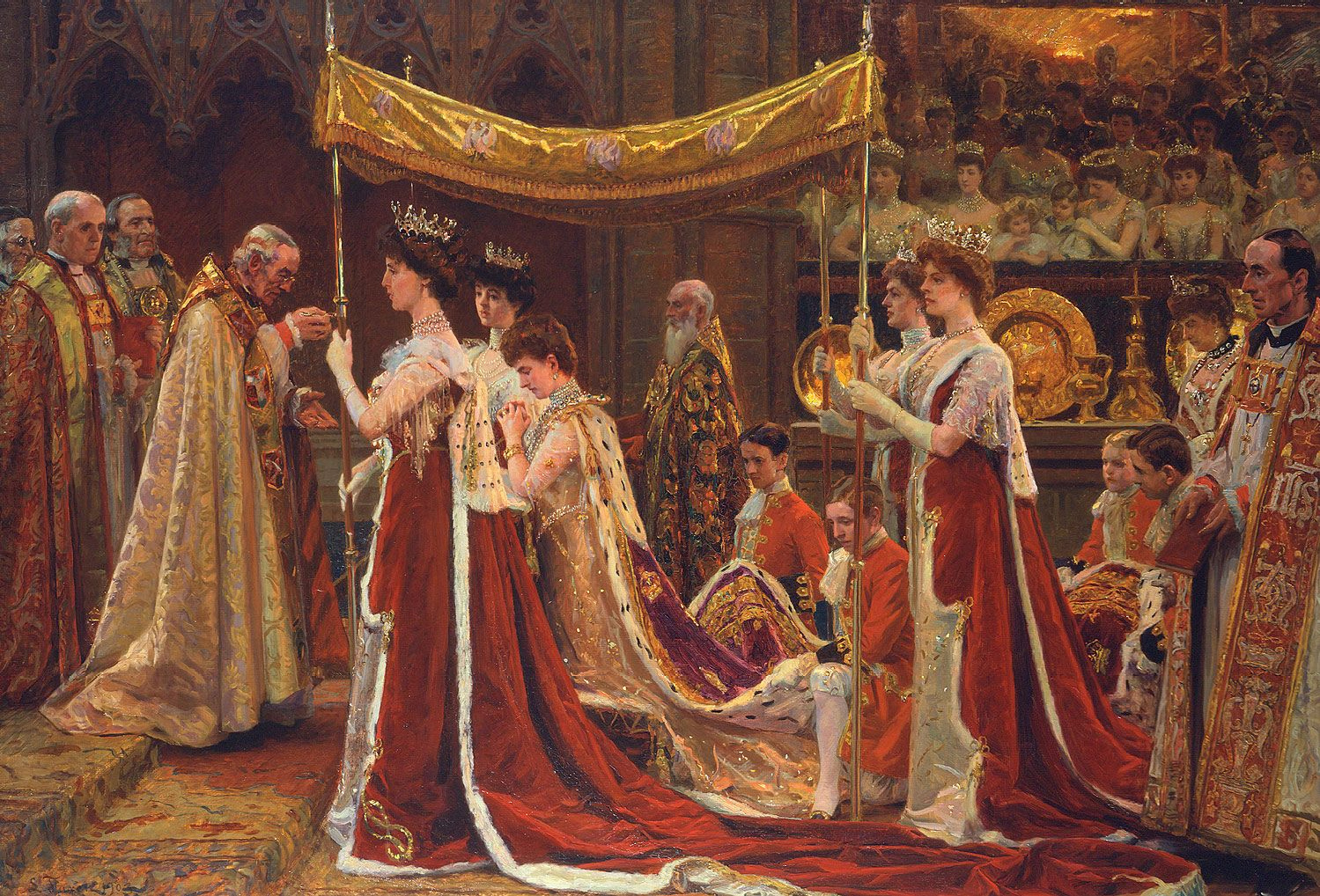
Pages of Honour carrying the train of Queen Alexandra during her anointing at the 1902 coronation of Edward VII, depicted in a painting by Laurits Tuxen

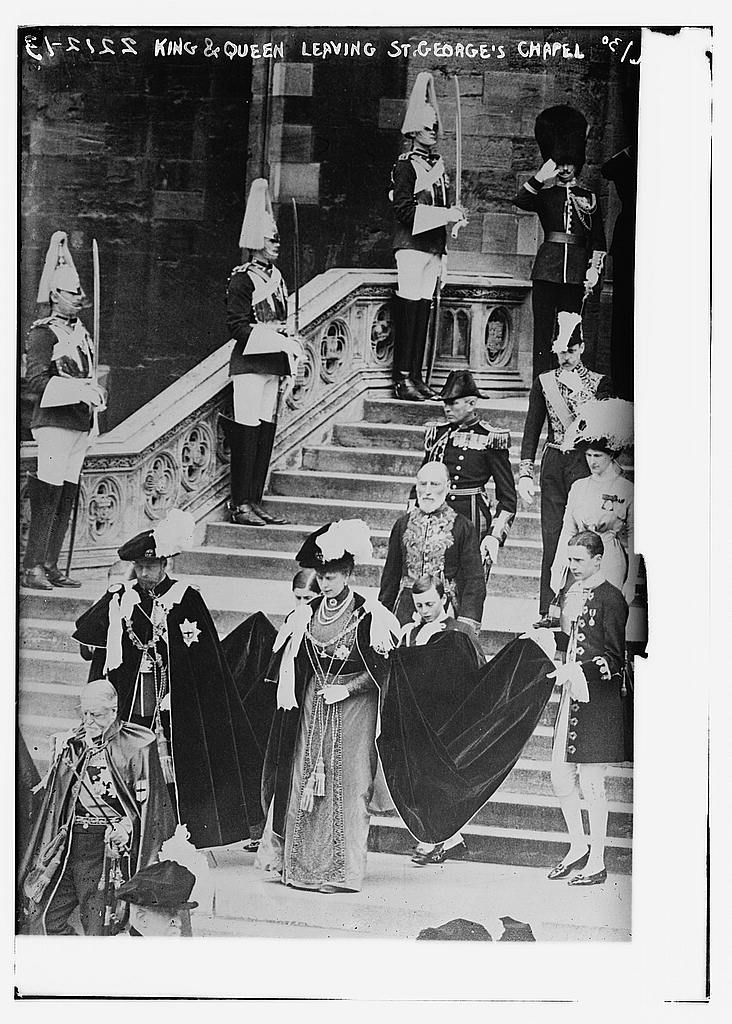
George V and Queen Mary are attended by Pages of Honour in 1911 as they leave St George's Chapel, Windsor Castle

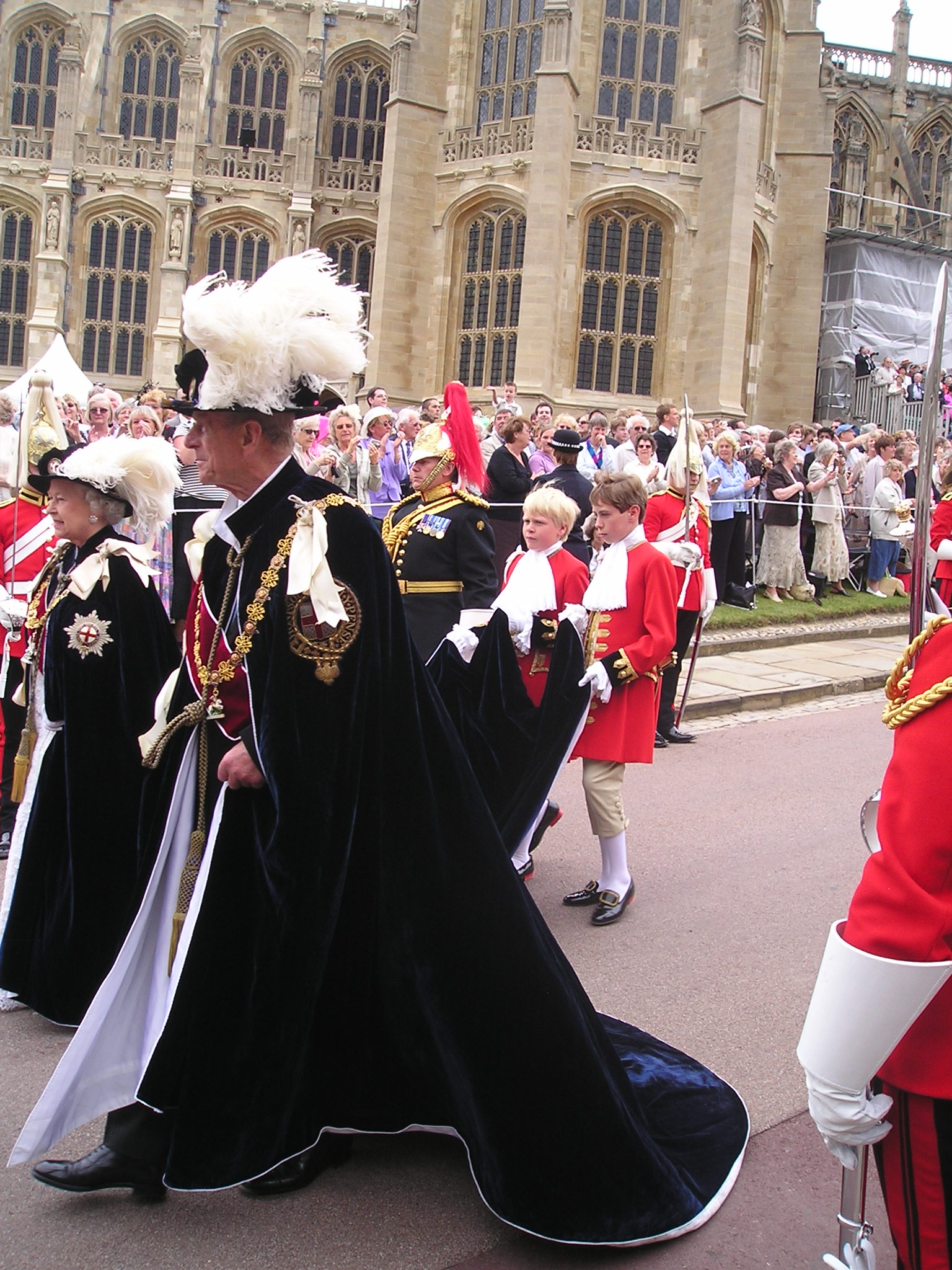
Pages of Honour to Elizabeth II in the procession to St George's Chapel, Windsor Castle, during the annual service of the Order of the Garter, 2006

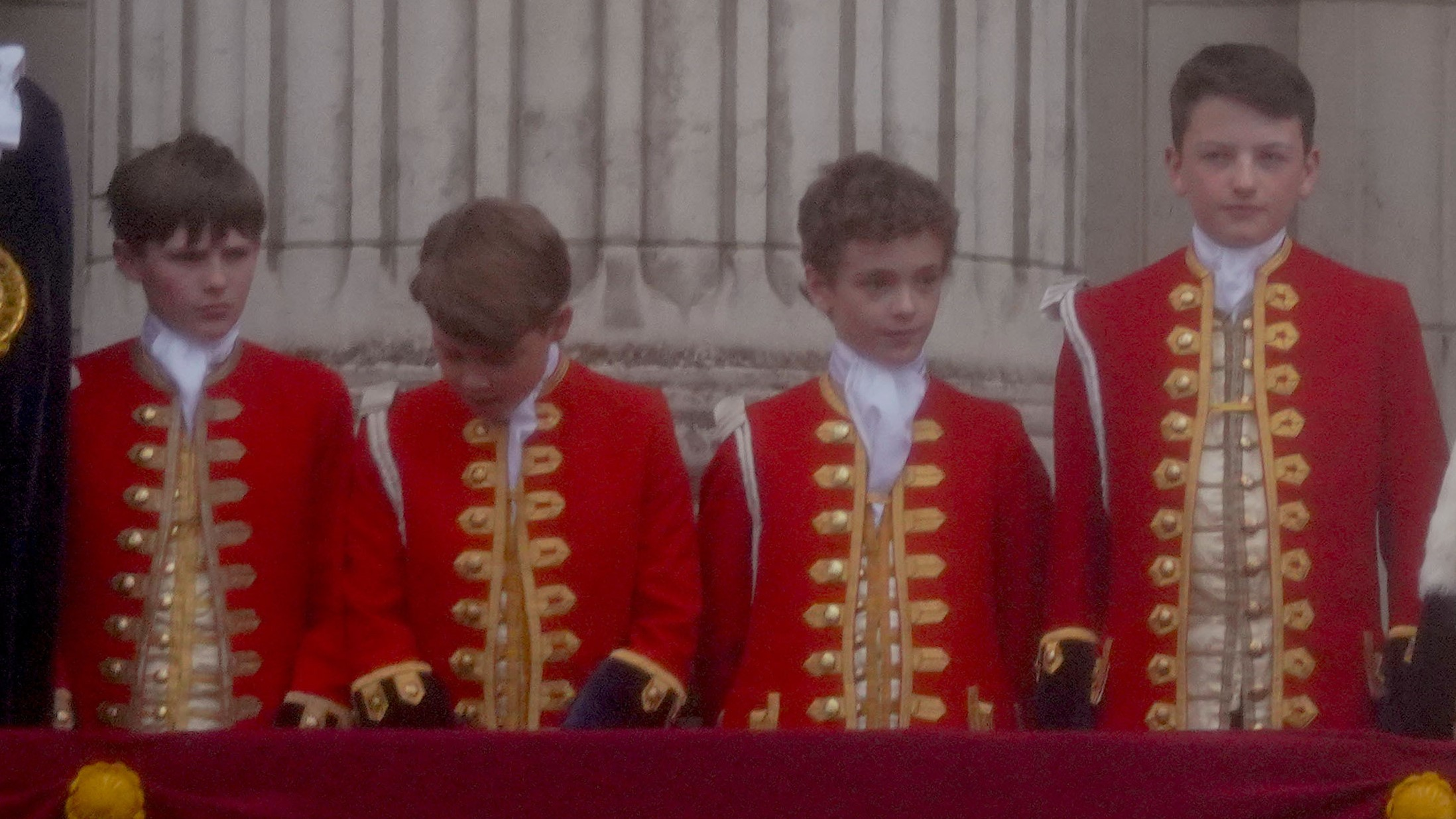
Pages of Honour on the balcony at Buckingham Palace after the 2023 coronation of Charles III and Queen Camilla

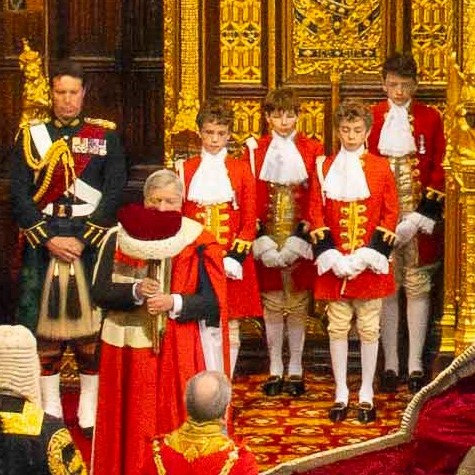
Pages of Honour at the 2023 State Opening of Parliament
