= Iain Johnstone =

English author, broadcaster and television producer (1943–2023)

- Born: 8 April 1943; Reading, Berkshire, England
- Died: 4 May 2023 (aged 80)
- Occupations: Author, broadcaster, television producer

Iain Johnstone (8 April 1943 – 4 May 2023) was an English author, broadcaster and television producer.

== Early life ==
Johnstone attended Crosfields School, Reading, Campbell College, Belfast and Bristol University.

== Career ==
Johnstone was the film critic of The Sunday Times for twelve years and presenter of the Film 82 programme (when regular presenter Barry Norman was busy with other projects). He was also its original producer, and produced other British TV programmes such as the BBC Two chat show Friday Night, Saturday Morning, The Frost Interview and ran the BBC's Watergate coverage.

Johnstone co-wrote the film Fierce Creatures (1997) with John Cleese, and made eight documentaries with Steven Spielberg, starting with The Jaws Report and including Steven and Stanley about Spielberg's collaboration with Stanley Kubrick. He also made numerous other film documentaries about A Fish Called Wanda (1988), Dustin Hoffman, Monty Python's The Meaning of Life (1983), Superman (1978) and TV profiles of Muhammad Ali, Woody Allen, Jack Nicholson, Barbra Streisand, John Wayne and Marlon Brando.

Johnstone was also a biographer of Tom Cruise and Clint Eastwood.

=== Author ===
Johnstone published the books, Streep: A Life in Film a biography of Oscar-winning actress Meryl Streep, the authorised biography of Tom Cruise, biographies on Dustin Hoffman and Clint Eastwood and three novels including Pirates of the Mediterranean.

His twelfth book, "Close Encounters – A Media Memoir" is published by Spellbinding Media. The book contains insights into movie stars and celebrities of the 20th Century where Johnstone tells of his time both on set and at home with screen luminaries Stanley Kubrick, Clint Eastwood and Barbra Streisand. He documents his return to Louisville with Muhammad Ali, his journey up the Nile with Peter Cook and Stephen Fry and his time spent with Dame Edna. He also reveals how he came to write a diary with Mel Gibson and spend time with Paul Newman and Robert Redford.

== Personal life and death ==
His daughter Sophie married the Hon. Edward John Hugh Tollemache in February 2007. Edward is the heir apparent of Timothy Tollemache, 5th Baron Tollemache. Sophie Johnstone had a bit part in A Fish Called Wanda at the age of six and presently works in television as a researcher.

His son, Oliver, is currently a member of the Royal Shakespeare Company, appearing as Iachimo in Cymbeline and Edgar in King Lear in 2016; he has appeared in supporting roles in numerous UK films in recent years.

Iain Johnstone died on 4 May 2023, at the age of 80.
