= Arnold Kemball =

British general (1820–1908)

General Sir Arnold Kemball KCB KCSI JP DL
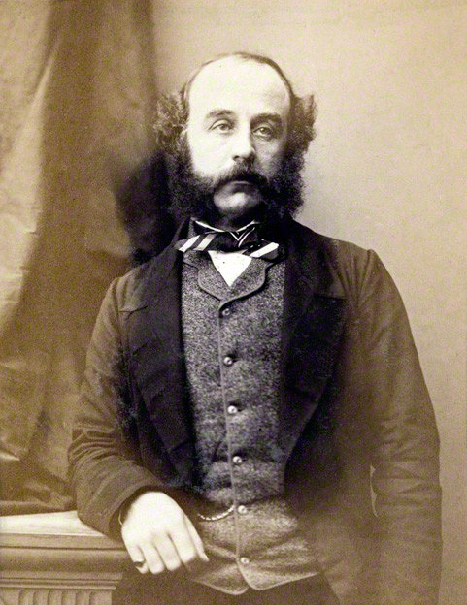
- Born: 18 November 1820; Bombay
- Died: 21 September 1908 (aged 87); London
- Occupations: British Army officer, consul, Resident, Political officer

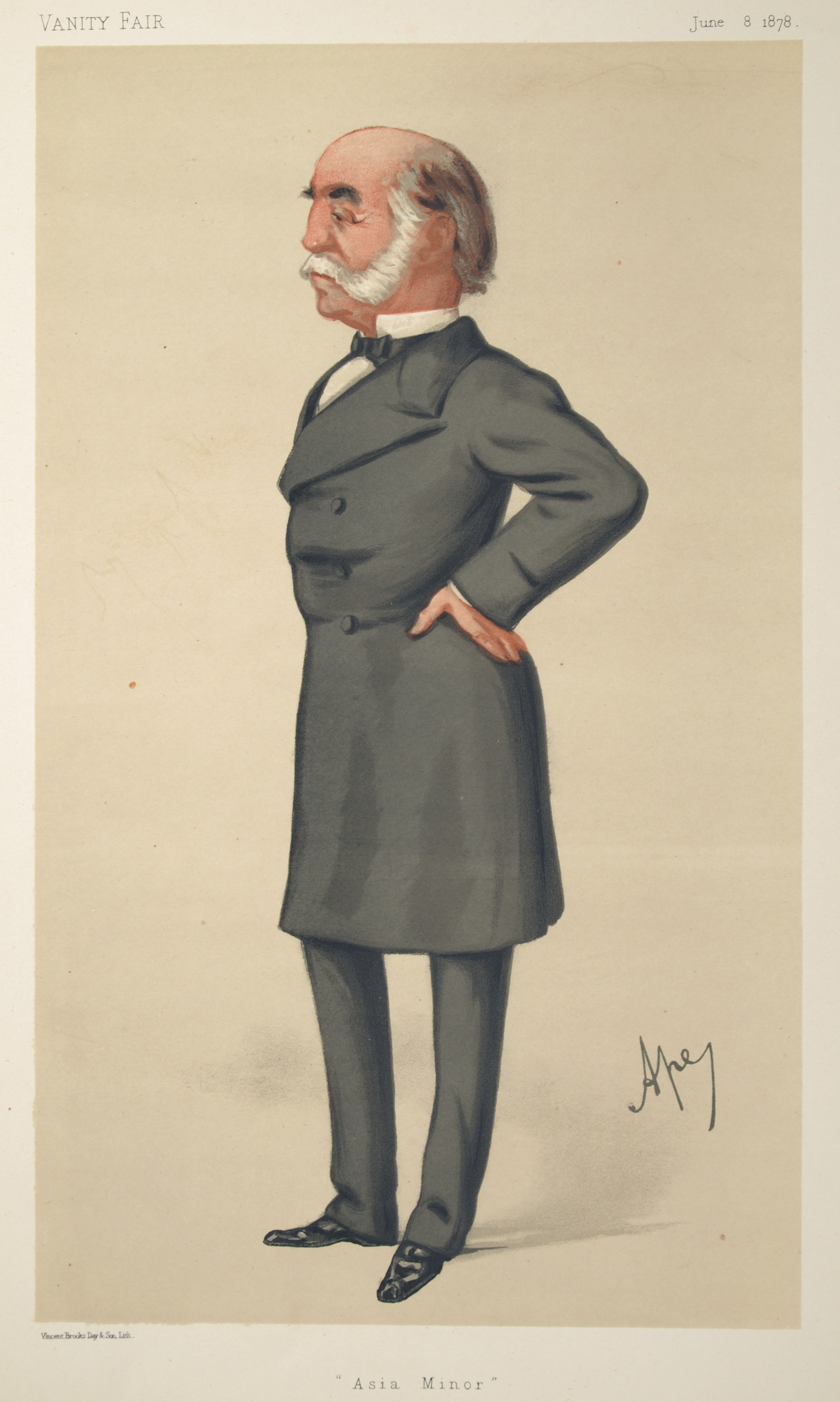
Vanity Fair caricature of 1878

General Sir Arnold Burrowes Kemball KCB KCSI JP DL (18 November 1820, Bombay – 21 September 1908, London) was a British Army officer who took part in the First Afghan War, the Persian War, the Serbian-Ottoman War and the Russo-Turkish War, and was British representative in the Persian Gulf and Consul at Baghdad.

== Early life ==
Kemball was born in Bombay, the son of Vero Shaw Kemball, Bombay Surgeon-General, and was one of five brothers. He was educated at Addiscombe Military Seminary in Surrey, England. In December 1837 he returned to Bombay and joined the Bombay Presidency's Artillery as a second lieutenant.

== First Afghan War and Persian War ==
During the First Afghan War (1839–1842) Kemball served with the Bombay Horse Artillery under Sir John Keane, saw action at the Battle of Ghazni on 23 July 1839, the capture of Kabul that followed, and the defeat of the Afghans at Khelat-i-Ghilzai during the subsequent British retreat to India. From 1842 to 1878 Kemball continued his military career in the Persian Gulf.

He took up military duties in the 1856–1857 Persian War, for which he gained honours and was mentioned in the dispatches of Lieutenant General James Outram. In 1857 the general orders of Lord Canning, Governor-General of India commended Kemball's role in the offensive against Ahwaz, thanking him for his services "afforded on every occasion of difficulty and danger, and especially in the brilliant expedition against Ahwaz". Sir James Outram gave Kemball "unqualified approbation and hearty thanks". Kemball was awarded a Companion of the Order of the Bath (CB) for the Persian campaign and was awarded the KCSI in May 1866.

== Diplomatic service ==
Kemball became Assistant Resident for the British Government at Bushehr in 1842, Resident in 1852, and in February 1851 was promoted to captain.

He was the British political agent for Turkish Arabia in 1847, between 1849 and 1851, and in 1855, and during that time mediated and signed off a Perpetual Treaty of Peace between chiefs of the Arabian Coast.

In 1859 Kemball became acting Consul General at Baghdad. He was promoted to lieutenant-colonel in 1860, and to full colonel in 1863. In 1873 he was appointed official attendant to the Shah of Persia on his visit to England.

Kemball was the British delegate at the 1875–76 British–Turkish–Persian–Russian boundary commission to determine the Turkish–Persian frontier. He later became the commission's president. In 1876 he served as British military commissioner accompanying Abdul-Kerim and his Turkish army in the 1876–77 Serbian–Ottoman War. During the 1876–1877 Constantinople Conference to provide political reform in Ottoman territories, Kemball acted as interpreter between Britain's Secretary of State for India and Ambassador Plenipotentiary to the conference, the Marquess of Salisbury and the Sultan, Abdul Hamid II.

== Russo-Turkish War ==
In the 1877–78 Russo-Turkish War Kemball resumed his role as a British military commissioner with the Turkish Army, advising on, and inspecting, aspects of Turkish battle-readiness. During the 16 June 1877 battle at Zaidakan, Kemble and a Captain Norman were reconnoitering and observing hostilities on horseback. After the battle, they were confronted by a band of Russian Cossacks. Kemble decided to escape the situation, and he and Norman were chased by the Cossacks over twenty-five miles, with contemporary reports stating that a shell had exploded between them, wounding Norman in the arm, and that Kemble could have been shot in the head. They outran the Cossacks, and when at the Aras River swam across it to reach the Turkish camp.

Of Kemble's role in the Russo-Turkish War, The Times correspondent with Abdul-Kerim's army wrote:

The position occupied by Sir Arnold Kemball is one of great importance, requiring much tact and discretion, a thorough knowledge of Oriental character, coupled with a keen appreciation of military difficulties. I doubt if there is another officer in Her Majesty's Army qualified to hold the post. A soldier by training and profession, yet a diplomatist from a thirteen years' experience as Consul-General at Bagdad, Sir Arnold possesses all the qualifications for his present responsible appointment. He possesses a thorough knowledge of Persian, Arabic, and Turkish, and can converse or correspond with equal fluency in either of these languages, while from his intimate knowledge of the customs of the people, he is able to gain their confidence. Sir Arnold is well content to sleep on the hill side, wrapped in a Turkish officer's coat, to share the greasy and innutritious food found in Turkish camps, to stand by the side of Turkish troops under a fire that our younger soldiers of Abyssinia and Ashantee do not dream of. It needs the constitution of a strong man to stand a ride of 259 miles in five consecutive days, with changes of temperature from snow-clad hills 9,000 feet above sea level to the dry and dusty plains of the Passin River. It needs a man with manly vigour to ride all day and write all night ; it needs a General with something more than his country's reputation at heart to travel about, occupying the position Sir Arnold Kemball does occupy here, unattended by an Aide-de-Camp, often accompanied only by a single Mahomedan horse-keeper, trusting to luck for his food and to the cold hill-side for his bed. By all this, by his simple unaffected manner, his unostentatious style of living, his warm sympathy for the Turkish soldiers, his severe condemnation of the conduct of many of their own officials, his indomitable energy and perseverance, his cheery spirits, and his gallant bearing on the field of battle, Sir Arnold has knitted to himself all with whom he has been thrown into contact, and while upholding in a pre-eminent degree the character of the British soldier, has never in the slightest degree given the Turkish officers reason to believe that his mission was to help them, or in any way to compromise the neutral position of our Government.

At the end of the War Kemble was awarded the KCB, promoted to general, and accompanied Lord Lyons in negotiations at the Berlin Congress.

== Civilian life ==
In 1868 Kemball married Anna Fanny Shaw, daughter of A. N. Shaw (died 25 February 1916). Their only child was Wynford Rose Kemball (died 16 May 1926), who married Bentley Tollemache, 3rd Baron Tollemache in 1902.

Between 1879 and 1886 Kemball became the Commissioner of the Sutherland Estates of the 3rd Duke of Sutherland; the estate was the largest in Britain and included most of the county of Sutherland. During his tenure as commissioner he was involved with a dispute concerning gold digging. In 1869 gold had been found in the Strath of Kildonan resulting in an influx of outside prospectors and the establishment of a company for exploitation; the financial returns were not favourable and digging was abandoned. However, in 1886, following a downturn in the local economy, villagers and crofters petitioned the Duke though Commissioner Kemball for permission to continue searching for gold; permission was not given, and the estate threatened government action if it carried-on. Following further unauthorised digging the estate took steps to stop it. Before the problem was resolved the turmoil surrounding unconstrained and persistent gold digging by locals had caused Kemball to resign as estate commissioner, and Lord Stafford, the local Sutherland parliamentary representative, to resign.
