= Mortimer Tollemache =

English cricketer

Personal information
- Full name: Mortimer Granville Tollemache
- Born: 12 April 1872; Westminster, London, England
- Died: 27 March 1950 (aged 77); Sudbury, Suffolk, England
- Batting: Right-handed
- Relatives: Lord Garlies (uncle); John Head (brother-in-law)

Domestic team information
- Years: Team
- 1891–1893: Cambridge University

Career statistics
Competition	First-class
Matches	9
Runs scored	151
Batting average	10.06
100s/50s	–/–
Top score	28
Catches/stumpings	10/–
- Source: Cricinfo, 26 January 2023

Mortimer Granville Tollemache (12 April 1872 – 27 March 1950) was an English cricketer who played first-class cricket in nine matches for Cambridge University between 1891 and 1893. He was born at Westminster, London and died at Sudbury, Suffolk.

Tollemache was the eleventh son of John Tollemache, 1st Baron Tollemache and one of 14 children. He was educated at Eton College and at Trinity College, Cambridge, though the directory of Cambridge University alumni does not state that he emerged with a degree. As a cricketer, he played as a right-handed middle-order batsman and appeared three times in the Eton v Harrow match. At Cambridge, he was played in early season matches across all three years from 1891 to 1893, but failed to make much impact, and was not awarded a Blue in any of the seasons. His best score in his nine games was 28, made in the second innings of his second game in 1891, a match between the Cambridge eleven and a scratch side raised by A. J. Webbe.

Tollemache became a banker, based at Bury St Edmunds in Suffolk. In the First World War, he served as a captain in the Suffolk Regiment's Territorial Force and was mentioned in dispatches.
