= Cook baronets of Doughty House (1886) =

Cook baronets
- Escutcheon of the Cook baronets of Doughty House
- Creation date: 1886
- Status: extant
- Motto: Esse quam videri, To be, rather than to seem
- Arms: Gules a rose Argent barbed and seeded Proper between three crescents of the second a chief Vaire.
- Crest: Issuant from a chaplet of roses Gules a dexter arm embowed Proper holding in the hand a mullet of six points Or between two branches of oak Vert

The Cook baronetcy of Doughty House, in the parish of Richmond, in the County of Surrey was created on 10 March 1886 for Francis Cook, head of Cook & Son, warehousemen. He was also the first Visconde de Monserrate (Viscount of Monserrate) in the Peerage of Portugal. The 2nd Baronet was Member of Parliament for Kennington from 1895 to 1906.

== Cook baronets of Doughty House, Richmond, Surrey (1886) ==
- Sir Francis Cook, 1st Baronet, 1st Viscount of Monserrate (28 January 1817 – 17 February 1901).
- Sir Frederick Lucas Cook, 2nd Baronet, 2nd Viscount of Monserrate (21 November 1844 – 21 May 1920).
- Sir Herbert Frederick Cook, 3rd Baronet, 3rd Viscount of Monserrate (18 November 1868 – 4 May 1939)
- Sir Francis Ferdinand Maurice Cook, 4th Baronet, 4th Viscount of Monserrate (21 December 1907 – 12 September 1978)
- Sir Christopher Wymondham Rayner Herbert Cook, 5th Baronet, 5th Viscount of Monserrate (born 24 March 1938)

The heir apparent is the present holder's eldest son Richard Herbert Aster Maurice Cook (born 1959).

== Notes ==
Baronetage of the United Kingdom
Preceded by Birkbeck baronets	Cook baronets of Doughty House; 10 March 1886	Succeeded by Palmer baronets
