= Lucy Abel Smith =

British author

Lucy Abel Smith FSA
- Education: University of London
- Occupations: Author; historian; arts administrator
- Spouse: David Francis Abel Smith (m. 1982)
- Relatives: Alexander Abel Smith (father-in-law)

Lucy Marie Abel Smith FSA (née Knox) is a British author, historian, arts administrator, and tourism businesswoman. She is the founder of the Fresh Air Sculpture exhibition, the Reality & Beyond tourism agency, and the Transylvania Book Festival.

== Biography ==
Lucy Marie Knox was raised in Ayrshire, where her father Bryce Knox was Lord Lieutenant before becoming Lord Lieutenant of Ayrshire and Arran. On 18 November 1982, she married David Francis Abel Smith, an engineer and son of British Army officer and banker Alexander Abel Smith. She studied medieval art at the University of London.

After working as a tour guide in Cold War-era Eastern Europe, Abel Smith and Jiří Kotalík wrote A Walking Guide to Prague, which she called "the first post-communist guidebook to the city". Her parents "want[ing her] to have a sensible job", she had a career as a guest lecturer, working at Art Fund, The British Museum Friends, Sotheby's, and the Victoria and Albert Museum. She also works as an art commissioner.

Abel Smith and her husband David live in Grade II-listed Quenington Old Rectory, where in 1992 they opened Fresh Air Sculpture, a biennial open-air sculpture exhibition at the rectory's garden. In June 2013, her open-air library, as part of the 2013 edition, was featured on The Daily Telegraph; inspired by medieval dovecotes, the library features art by Romanian local artist Ion Constantinescu, and ceramicist Carol McNicoll, textile artist Donna Wilson.

Abel Smith has a career in the tourism industry, and she is the founder of Reality & Beyond, a tourism agency that specialises in the arts and literature. In 2013, she founded the Transylvania Book Festival in Richiș, a village in Sibiu County, Romania. In 2016, she published Travels in Transylvania, a travel book focused on the valley around the Târnava river.

She was appointed Fellow of the Society of Antiquaries on 5 May 2012.
