= Sir Mark Palmer, 5th Baronet =

British aristocrat (born 1941)

Sir Mark Palmer Bt
- Born: 21 November 1941 (age 84); Cirencester, Gloucestershire, England
- Education: Eton College
- Occupations: English Boy, early modelling agency; New Age traveller
- Known for: Page of Honour to the Queen
- Parents: Sir Anthony Palmer, 4th Baronet; Henriette, Lady Abel Smith

Sir Charles Mark Palmer, 5th Baronet (born 21 November 1941) is a British modelling agency manager who formed one of the first modelling agencies devoted to the male image, and later adopted an alternative lifestyle, travelling around Britain in a horse-drawn caravan.

== Early life ==
Mark Palmer is the son of Sir Anthony Palmer, 4th Baronet and Henriette, Lady Abel Smith. His godmother was Queen Elizabeth II.

Palmer was educated at Eton College and spent a year at the University of Oxford.

From 1956 to 1959, he was Page of Honour to Queen Elizabeth II.

== Career ==
In 1966, Palmer and Alice Pollock founded the early male modelling agency English Boy in Chelsea, London, with Palmer as manager. As Palmer said, "to change the image of British manhood and put the boy, as opposed to the girl, on the magazine cover in the future." In 1967, The New York Times reported that Palmer's English Boy had 12 young men on its books, "they are lean in the Twiggy style and look as though they need a good night's sleep. They don't smile.", and that they often buy their clothes from Hung On You. Other clients included Christine Keeler, who Palmer wanted to represent for films and television as well as modelling, but according to Keeler, "nothing developed". Brian Jones and Anita Pallenberg were also on the agency's books, but no work resulted.

By the end of the 1960s and into the 1970s, he was the leader of a wealthy band of New Age travellers who moved about in horse-drawn caravans and spent much time in the 1970s at Stargroves, the house and estate in East Woodhay, Hampshire, owned by Mick Jagger.

In 1972, Palmer helped Marc Bolan's wife June with a wide-ranging search for a country house, and they bought the Grade II listed Old Rectory at Weston-under-Penyard, near Ross-on-Wye, which Bolan owned until 1977.

He made by hand the coffin for the 1999 funeral at London's Brompton Cemetery of the artists' model and memoirist Henrietta Moraes, who had spent time with Palmer in the early 1970s in his "cavalcade of horse-drawn caravans".

== Personal life ==
Palmer was married to the astrologer Catherine Tennant (1947-2021), daughter of Baron Glenconner, who wrote a weekly column for the Daily Telegraph's magazine.

The couple had two children, a daughter Iris and a son Arthur, the latter being the heir to the baronetcy.

== Arms ==
Coat of arms of Sir Mark Palmer, 5th Baronet
Crest In front of a tilting spear erect Proper a wyvern Or resting the dexter foot on a crescent Argent. Escutcheon Sable on a chevron between three crescents in chief and a lion passant in base Argent two tilting spears chevron-wise Proper. Motto Par Sit Fortuna Labori

Court offices
Preceded by Hon. Charles Wilson	First Page of Honour; 1956–1959	Succeeded by Hon. Julian Hardinge
Baronetage of the United Kingdom
Preceded by Anthony Palmer	Baronet (of Grinkle Park and Newcastle-upon-Tyne); 1941–present	Incumbent
