= Wilbraham Tollemache, 2nd Baron Tollemache =

British politician and peer (1832–1904)

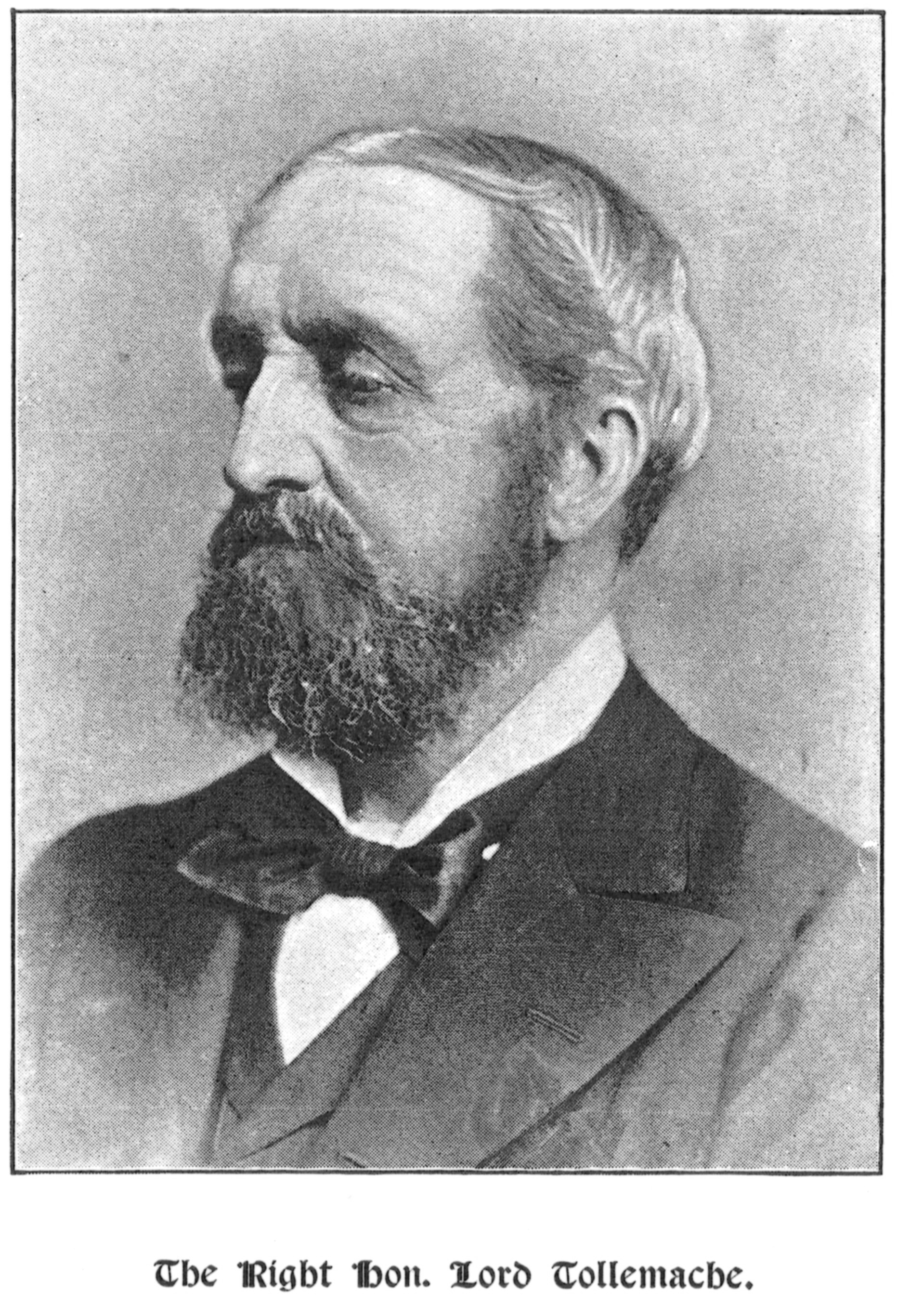
Pictured in Suffolk Celebrities, 1893

Wilbraham Frederic Tollemache, 2nd Baron Tollemache (4 July 1832 – 17 December 1904), was a British Conservative politician and peer.

== Career ==
Tollemache was the eldest son of John Jervis Tollemache, 1st Baron Tollemache, and his first wife Georgina Louisa Best. He was elected to the House of Commons for Cheshire West in 1868 (succeeding his father), a constituency he represented until 1885. In 1890 he succeeded his father as second Baron Tollemache and took his seat in the House of Lords.

== Family ==
Lord Tollemache married twice, and left four sons and two daughters by his first wife.

His eldest son, Hon. Lyonel Plantagenet Tollemache (1860–1902) died in August 1902 after he fainted while taking a swim. He was married to Lady Blanche Sybil King (1862–1923), only daughter and heiress of Robert King, 7th Earl of Kingston, and left two sons.

Lord Tollemache died in December 1904, aged 72, and was succeeded in the barony by his grandson Bentley Lyonel John Tollemache.

== Coat of arms ==
Coat of arms of Wilbraham Tollemache, 2nd Baron Tollemache
Notes Coat of arms of the Tollemache family Coronet The coronet of a baron Crest A Horse's Head erased Argent between two Wings Or pellety Escutcheon Argent a Fret Sable Supporters On either side a Stag guardant proper gorged with a Collar flory counterflory Or Motto Confido Conquiesco (Latin for 'I trust and am content')

Parliament of the United Kingdom
Preceded by John Tollemache; Sir Philip Grey Egerton	Member of Parliament for Cheshire West; 1872–1885; With: Sir Philip Grey Egerton 1872–1881; Henry James Tollemache 1881–1885	constituency abolished
Peerage of the United Kingdom
Preceded by John Tollemache	Baron Tollemache; 1890–1904	Succeeded by Bentley Lyonel John Tollemache
