= Bentley Lyonel John Tollemache, 3rd Baron Tollemache =

British peer (1883-1955)

Bentley Lyonel John Tollemache, 3rd Baron Tollemache, DL, JP (7 March 1883 – 13 January 1955) was a British Army officer, peer and writer on croquet and bridge.

== Early life ==
Bentley Lyonel John Tollemache was born in 1883, the son of Hon. Lyonel Plantagenet Tollemache (1860–1902) and Lady Blanche Sybil King (1862–1923), only daughter and heiress of Robert King, 7th Earl of Kingston. He was educated at Eton College.

Bentley's father died in August 1902 after collapsing while taking a swim, and Bentley therefore became heir to his grandfather, Wilbraham Tollemache, 2nd Baron Tollemache of Helmingham Hall, Suffolk, and Peckforton Castle, Cheshire. He duly succeeded him to the barony in December 1904, becoming owner of 35,726 acres (145 km^{2}) of land in Suffolk and in Cheshire, Denbigh and Flint.

In 1924 he appealed to the tax commissioners against an assessment for supertax of £17,343 and £18,000 for the years 1921 and 1922.

He was a Justice of the Peace and later became a Deputy Lieutenant. Before his marriage he was also a member of the Bachelors' Club.

== Military service ==
Boer War

On 21 August 1901 Tollemache was commissioned a Second Lieutenant in the 3rd (Militia) Battalion of the King's Own Scottish Borderers. The Battalion had been embodied for active service in South Africa and he too served in the Second Boer War, returning in June 1902. By 1905–06, he had been promoted to captain. In 1906, he transferred to the 3rd Battalion Cheshire Regiment, nearer to his ancestral home, and served for another two years.

Great War

During the First World War, he served briefly as a Lieutenant Commander in the Royal Naval Reserve in 1915, before transferring back to the British Army as a captain and serving in the Royal Garrison Artillery from 1916; he was wounded.

== Family life ==
Tollemache first married in 1902 Wynford Rose Kemball (died 16 May 1926), daughter of army officer and diplomat General Sir Arnold Burrowes Kemball, KCB, KCSI. They had two daughters: Hon. Dorothy Tollemache, Mrs. Verney (1907-1994); and Hon. Frances Tollemache, Mrs. Lloyd-Worth [1949-1965], (1908-1992), briefly a wartime 2nd Officer in the ATA. Tollemache was widowed in 1926.

His second marriage, in 1928, was to Lynette Pawson, MBE, of Nynehead Court, Somerset. They had one daughter: Hon. Diana Tollemache, Mrs. Diehl (1930-2012).

Lord Tollemache died in 1955 and is buried in the churchyard of St Mary's Church, Helmingham. As he had no son, he was succeeded in the Barony by his cousin John Edward Hamilton Tollemache, 4th Baron Tollemache, (1910–1975).

== Publications ==
Over the years, Lord Tollemache was the author of several books on croquet and on contract bridge:

- 1914: Croquet
- 1914: The Chronological Order System - the key to safe calling in contract bridge
- 1923: Croquet: hints on "practice," "tactics," and "stroke play"
- 1926: Croquet
- 1931: The Key to Safe Slam Calling in Contract Bridge
- 1947: Modern Croquet Tips and Practice

== Coat of arms ==
Coat of arms of Bentley Lyonel John Tollemache, 3rd Baron Tollemache
Notes Coat of arms of the Tollemache family Coronet The coronet of a baron Crest A Horse's Head erased Argent between two Wings Or pellety Escutcheon Argent a Fret Sable Supporters On either side a Stag guardant proper gorged with a Collar flory counterflory Or Motto Confido Conquiesco (Latin for 'I trust and am content')

Peerage of the United Kingdom
Preceded by Wilbraham Tollemache	Baron Tollemache; 1904–1955	Succeeded by John Tollemache
