= Bryce Knox =

Colonel Sir Bryce Muir Knox of Glengarnock and Redhugh KCVO MC (4 April 1916 – 22 November 2003) was a Scottish soldier, business man, and Lord lieutenant of Ayrshire.

== Early life ==
The son of James Knox and Dorothy Fry, a member of the J. S. Fry & Sons chocolate-making family, Knox was brought up at Dalry, North Ayrshire, near Kilbirnie, where his family had a textile mill which made linen thread and fishing nets. He first rode to hounds with the Eglinton Hunt aged six.

He was educated at Stowe School and Trinity College, Cambridge, then returned to join the family firm of W. & J. Knox. In 1938, he was commissioned into the Ayrshire Yeomanry, a cavalry regiment. In August 1939, he was called up, and by December his regiment had converted to artillery and was sent to Orkney to defend Scapa Flow. In November 1942 Knox, now commanding "A" Battery, sailed to Tunisia. During the Second World War he saw active service in North Africa, Italy, and Austria. During the Italian campaign, he was awarded the Military Cross for "complete disregard for personal safety" and his "devotion to duty, courage and judgment" in a battle north of Arezzo in July 1944. Within three months he received a bar to the medal for his part in defeating an enemy attack on a tactical headquarters, including the evacuation of the wounded under fire.

Knox was second-in-command of the Ayrshire Yeomanry by the end of the war.

== Later career ==
After the war, Knox returned to his business in Ayrshire, while continuing to serve in his regiment, which he commanded from 1953 to 1956. He was its Honorary Colonel from 1967 to 1971, and was awarded the Territorial Decoration.

In 1969, he was appointed as Vice-Lord-Lieutenant, and between 1974 and 1991 was Lord-Lieutenant of Ayrshire. In the 1990 Birthday Honours, for his service as Lord-Lieutenant he was appointed as a Knight Commander of the Royal Victorian Order.

He farmed his land near Ayr, and in 1990 was elected as president of the Royal Highland and Agricultural Society of Scotland, succeeding George Younger. When he retired from the family mill at Kilbirnie, soon after its bicentenary, it was employing three hundred people, and he sold it to Cosalt.

In more than seventy seasons of fox hunting, Knox rode with fifty different packs of hounds, finally retiring at the age of 81. His natural ebullience left him after the ban on fox hunting by the Scottish Parliament in 2002, which he said was "worse than anything in the war".

== Personal life ==
In 1948, at Martnaham near Ayr, Bryce Knox married Patricia Dunsmuir, who died before him. They had one son and one daughter, Lucy Abel Smith.

== Publications ==
B. M. Knox, Brief Historical Notes on Ayrshire Yeomanry (Earl of Carrick's Own) 152nd Field Regiment, Royal Artillery 1939-45 (Ayr: Stephen & Pollock, 1946)
