= John Tollemache, 1st Baron Tollemache =

British politician, slaveowner, landowner and peer

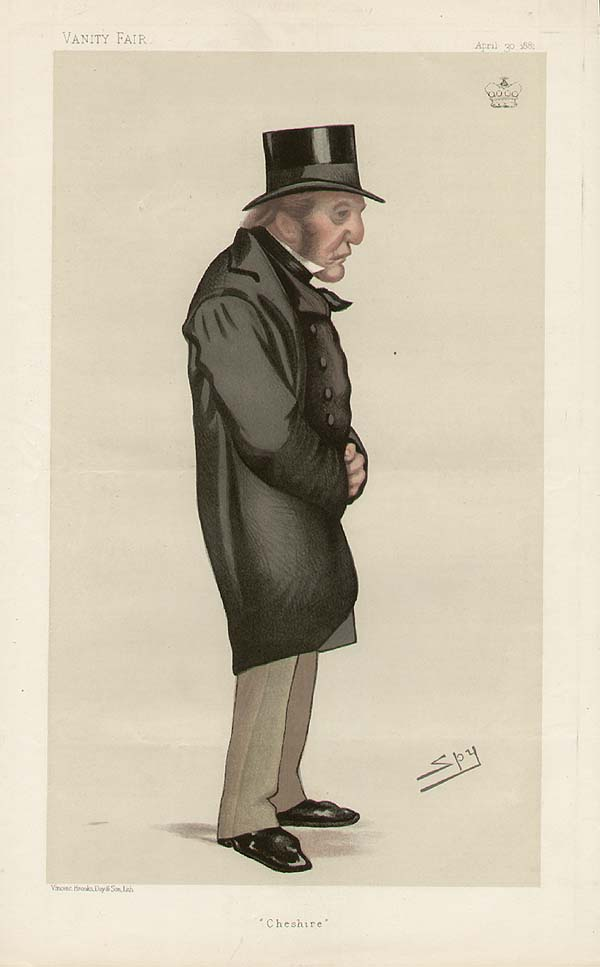
"Cheshire" Lord Tollemache as caricatured by Spy (Leslie Ward) in Vanity Fair, April 1881

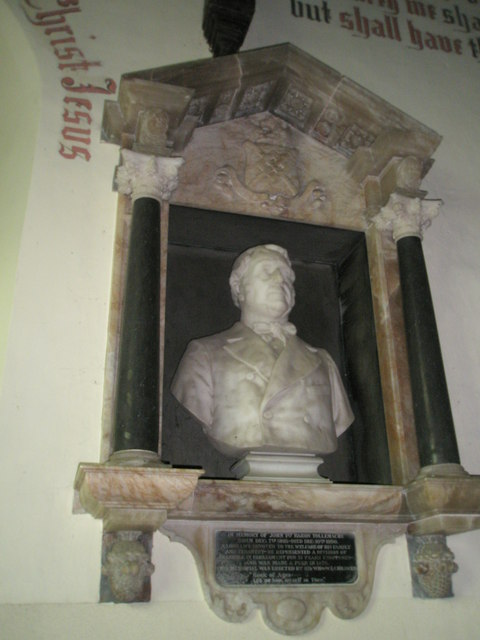
Marble bust of Lord Tollemache in St Mary's Church, Helmingham

John Jervis Tollemache, 1st Baron Tollemache (né Halliday; 5 December 1805 – 9 December 1890) was a British Conservative politician, slaveowner, landowner and peer who owned large estates in Cheshire. He was raised to the peerage of the United Kingdom in 1876 as Baron Tollemache, of Helmingham Hall in Suffolk.

== Origins ==
Born in 1805 as John Jervis Halliday, his father was Admiral John Richard Delap Halliday (who in 1821 assumed by royal licence the surname and arms of Tollemache in lieu of Halliday), the eldest son of Lady Jane Halliday, youngest daughter and co-heiress of Lionel Tollemache, 4th Earl of Dysart (died 1770). His mother was Lady Elizabeth Stratford, a daughter of John Stratford, 3rd Earl of Aldborough. His sister was Georgina Cowper-Temple, Lady Mount Temple.

== Career ==
Little is known about his education, but it appears that he received a private education which did not lead to university. He inherited considerable wealth, including Helmingham Hall in Suffolk and estates in Northamptonshire, Cheshire and Ireland.

Tollemache served as High Sheriff of Cheshire for 1840. He was then elected to the House of Commons as MP for Cheshire South from 1841 to 1868, and for Cheshire West from 1868 to 1872. He was raised to the peerage in 1876 as Baron Tollemache, of Helmingham Hall in the county of Suffolk.

== Landholdings ==
Tollemache was the largest landowner in Cheshire, owning 28,651 acres (115.95 km^{2}). His estate exceeded those of the Duke of Westminster (who owned 15,138 acres (61.26 km^{2})), Lord Crewe (with 10,148 acres (41.07 km^{2})) and Lord Cholmondeley (with 16,992 acres (68.76 km^{2})).

William Ewart Gladstone described him as "the greatest estate manager of his day". Tollemache was generous to his tenants and advocated improvement of their social conditions. He believed in a self-reliant labouring class and popularised the idea of tenants having a cottage with sufficient land to keep livestock. His catch-phrase for this was "three acres and a cow", a policy he carried out in Framsden, a village on the Helmingham Hall estate. In addition to building many cottages, he built over 50 farmhouses, on which project he spent £280,000.

Tollemache's major building project was Peckforton Castle, a new family seat in the form of a Norman-style castle. It was built on a massive scale on the Peckforton Hills within his Cheshire estate. It cost around £60,000 (equivalent to £7,000,000 as of 2025), and is deemed the last serious fortified home built in England.

In 1839, Tollemache, who had owned 822 slaves on the island of Antigua across 6 estates, received nearly £13,000 to compensate him for his losses upon the abolition of slavery in the British Empire.

== Marriage and issue ==
He married twice:

- Firstly, in 1826, to Georgina Louisa Best (d. 1846), a daughter of Thomas Best, by whom he had five children, including:
  - Wilbraham Tollemache, 2nd Baron Tollemache, the eldest son and heir.
  - Lionel Arthur Tollemache, who married Beatrix Lucia Catherine Tollemache, daughter of William Egerton, 1st Baron Egerton of Tatton
- Secondly, in 1850, he married Eliza Georgiana Duff (d. 1918) – who was 24 years younger than him – a daughter of Sir James Duff, by whom he had a further nine children, including:
  - John. R. D. Tollemache, eldest son by his second wife, who married Eleanor Starnes, a daughter of the Hon. Henry Starnes by his wife Eleanor Stuart.
  - Douglas Tollemache (1862–1944), Stratford Tollemache (1864–1937) and Mortimer Tollemache (1872–1950), the three brothers who founded Tollemache Brewery.

== Death and succession ==
Tollemache died in December 1890, aged 85. He was succeeded in the barony by his eldest son from his first marriage, Wilbraham Tollemache, 2nd Baron Tollemache.

== Coat of arms ==
Coat of arms of John Tollemache, 1st Baron Tollemache
Notes Coat of arms of the Tollemache family Coronet The coronet of a baron Crest A Horse's Head erased Argent between two Wings Or pellety Escutcheon Argent a Fret Sable Supporters On either side a Stag guardant proper gorged with a Collar flory counterflory Or Motto Confido Conquiesco (Latin for 'I trust and am content')

Parliament of the United Kingdom
Preceded by George Wilbraham; Sir Philip Grey Egerton	Member of Parliament for South Cheshire; 1841–1868; With: Sir Philip Grey Egerton	Constituency abolished
New constituency	Member of Parliament for West Cheshire; 1868–1872; With: Sir Philip Grey Egerton	Succeeded by Wilbraham Tollemache; Sir Philip Grey Egerton
Honorary titles
Preceded by Thomas Hibbert	High Sheriff of Cheshire; 1840	Succeeded by John Ryle
Peerage of the United Kingdom
New creation	Baron Tollemache; 1876–1890	Succeeded by Wilbraham Tollemache
