= Palmer baronets of Grinkle Park and of Newcastle upon Tyne (1886) =

Baronetage of the United Kingdom

Palmer baronets
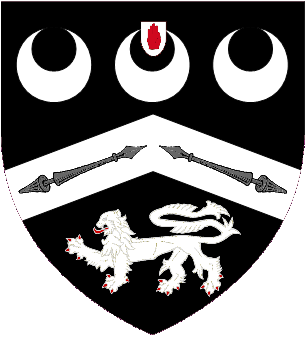
- Escutcheon of the Palmer baronets of Grinkle Park and of Newcastle upon Tyne
- Creation date: 1886
- Status: extant
- Motto: Par sit fortuna labori, May the success be equal to the labour
- Arms: Sable on a chevron between three crescents in chief and a lion passant in base Argent two tilting spears chevron-wise Proper.
- Crest: In front of a tilting spear erect Proper a wyvern Or resting the dexter foot on a crescent Argent.

The Palmer Baronetcy, of Grinkle Park in the County of York and of Newcastle upon Tyne, was created in the Baronetage of the United Kingdom on 31 July 1886 for Charles Palmer, a coal and shipping magnate and Liberal politician. The third Baronet, residing at Walworth Castle was High Sheriff of Durham in 1915. The title vests in its fifth holder.

== Palmer baronets, of Grinkle Park and of Newcastle upon Tyne (1886) ==
- Sir Charles Mark Palmer, 1st Baronet (1822–1907)
- Sir George Robson Palmer, 2nd Baronet (1849–1910)
- Sir Alfred Molyneux Palmer, 3rd Baronet (1853–1935)
- Sir Anthony Frederick Mark Palmer, 4th Baronet (1914–1941)
- Sir (Charles) Mark Palmer, 5th Baronet (born 1941)

The heir apparent is Arthur Morris Palmer (born 1981), son of the above.

== See also ==
- Palmer baronets

== Notes ==
Baronetage of the United Kingdom
| Preceded by Cook baronets | Palmer baronets of Grinkle Park and of Newcastle upon Tyne; 31 July 1886 | Succeeded by Mappin baronets |
