= Arthur Wellesley Torrens =

British army officer and administrator (1809–1855)

Major-General Sir Arthur Wellesley Torrens KCB
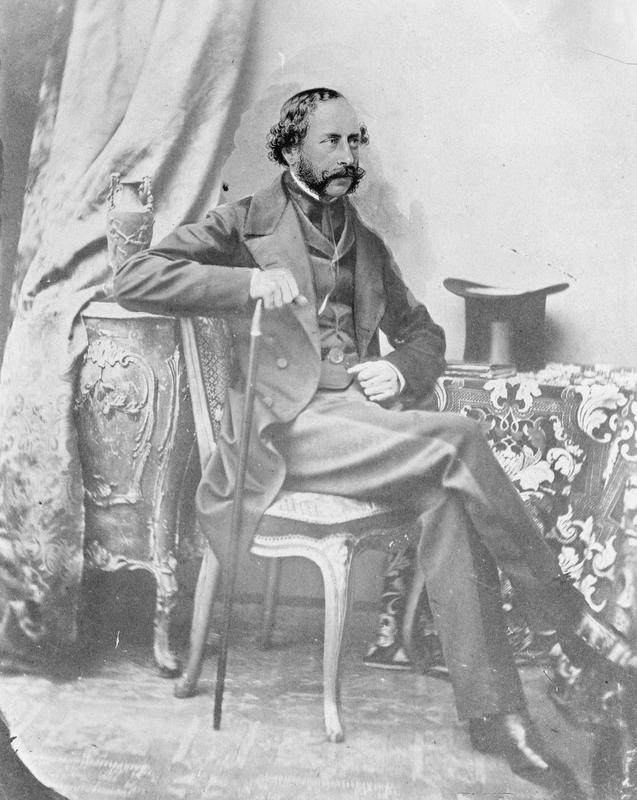
- Born: 18 August 1809
- Died: 24 August 1855 (aged 46) Paris, France

Sir Arthur Wellesley Torrens KCB (18 August 1809 – 24 August 1855) was a British Army officer and colonial administrator. He reached the rank of major-general.

== Early life ==
He was the second son of Major-general Sir Henry Torrens and his wife, Sarah, daughter of Robert Patton, governor of St Helena, born on 18 August 1809; he was a godson of the Duke of Wellington. In 1819 he was appointed a page of honour to the Prince Regent.

Torrens passed through the Royal Military College, Sandhurst, and obtained a commission as ensign in the Grenadier Guards, becoming lieutenant on 14 April 1825. He was appointed adjutant of the second battalion with the temporary rank of captain on 11 June 1829. He was promoted captain on 12 June 1830. He continued to serve as adjutant of his battalion until 1838, when he was appointed brigade-major at Quebec on the staff of Major-general Sir James Macdonell, commanding a brigade in Canada. He took part in the operations against the Lower Canada Rebellion at the close of that year. He was promoted to lieutenant-colonel on 11 September 1840, when he returned to England.

== Royal Welch Fusiliers ==
Torrens exchanged into the 23rd Royal Welch Fusiliers, and obtained its command on 15 October 1841. On the expansion of the army in April 1842 a second battalion was given to the regiment. The depot was moved from Carlisle to Chichester, where, with two new companies, it was organised for foreign service under Torrens, who embarked with it at Portsmouth for Canada on 13 May, arriving at Montreal on 30 June.

In September 1843 Torrens went, in command of the first battalion, from Quebec to the West Indies, arriving at Barbados in October 1843. The battalion was moved from one island to another, but for two years and a half Torrens commanded the troops in Saint Lucia and administered the civil government of the island. The sanitary measures adopted by Torrens for the preservation of the health of the troops were considered exemplary, and correspondence on the subject was published in November 1847 by order of the Duke of Wellington, as commander-in-chief.

Torrens declined the offer of the lieutenant-governorship of Saint Lucia as a permanent appointment. He sailed with his battalion from Barbados in March 1847, arriving at Halifax, Nova Scotia in the following month. The battalion returned to England in September 1848, and was stationed at Winchester, where, on 12 July 1849, Prince Albert presented it with new colours. In April 1850 Torrens moved with the battalion to Plymouth, and the following year relinquished the command. On 1 January 1853 he was appointed an assistant quartermaster-general at the Horse Guards, and became a member of a commission researching the military of France, Austria, and Prussia.

== Crimean War ==
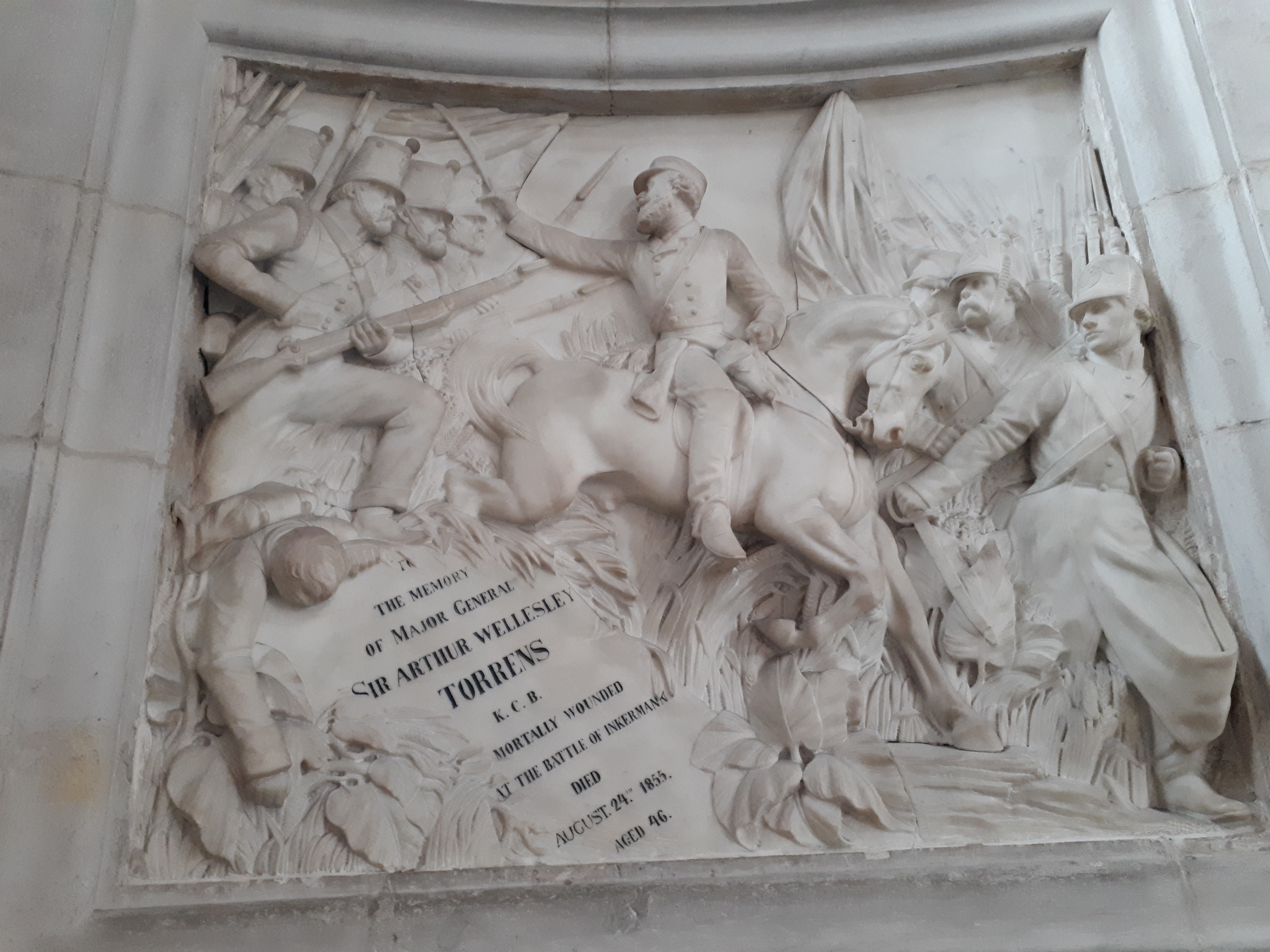
Memorial to Maj. Gen. Torrens by Carlo Marochetti at the St. Paul's Cathedral

In the Crimean War, Torrens was nominated a brigadier-general to command an infantry brigade. He joined the 4th Infantry Division under Sir George Cathcart at Varna, just before its embarkation. He was at the head of his brigade both at the Battle of Alma and at the Battle of Balaklava, where he was engaged in support of the cavalry and lost some men in recapturing two redoubts. On the morning of 5 November 1854, at the Battle of Inkermann, under the direction of Cathcart, he attacked the left flank of the Russian forces, his horse falling under him, pierced by five bullets, and was praised by Cathcart just before his mortal wound. He was struck by a bullet that passed through his body, injured a lung, splintered a rib, and was found lodged in his greatcoat.

Torrens was invalided home. He received the Crimea Medal and clasp, the thanks of Parliament, was promoted to be a major-general for distinguished service in the field on 12 December 1854, and was made a knight commander of the Bath, military division.

== Death ==
On 2 April 1855 Torrens was appointed deputy quartermaster-general at headquarters, and on 25 June the same year was sent as a major-general on the staff to Paris as British military commissioner; but his health broke down, and he died in Paris on 24 August 1855. He was buried in the cemetery of Père-Lachaise.

== Works ==
Torrens published Notes on French Infantry and Memoranda on the Review of the Army in Paris at the Feast of Eagles in May 1852 (London, 1852).

== Family ==
Torrens married in 1832 Maria Jane, youngest daughter of General Sir John Murray, 8th Baronet. After his death she erected a monument to him in St Paul's Cathedral.
