= Edward Tollemache =

British aristocrat and banker (born 1976)

The Honourable Edward Tollemache
- Born: 12 May 1976 (age 50)
- Education: Marlborough College
- Alma mater: Newcastle University
- Occupation: Banker
- Spouse: Sophie Johnstone
- Children: 3
- Parent(s): Timothy Tollemache, 5th Baron Tollemache; Alexandra Meynell
- Relatives: Iain Johnstone (father-in-law)

Edward John Hugo Tollemache (born 12 May 1976) is a British aristocrat and banker.

== Early life ==
Tollemache is the eldest son and heir apparent of Timothy Tollemache, 5th Baron Tollemache, and as the son of a baron can use the pre-nominal style of The Honourable. His mother is Alexandra, Lady Tollemache. Tollemache was christened at St. Mary's Church, Helmingham, with Charles, Prince of Wales, as a godparent and uncle Michael Tollemache acting as proxy for the Prince. From 1988 to 1990 he was a Page of Honour to The Queen. He was educated at Marlborough College (1991–1995). He graduated from Newcastle University with a degree in business management and marketing in 1999.

== Career ==
Tollemache worked at Merrill Lynch between graduation and 2002. He worked for Fleming Family & Partners Asset Management from 2002 to 2012 as a fund manager. Since then, he has worked at Lord North Street.

== Personal life ==
On 3 February 2007 Tollemache married Sophie Johnstone, daughter of the broadcaster Iain Johnstone, at St Columba's, Church of Scotland, Knightsbridge. The Prince of Wales and Andrew Neil were amongst guests at their wedding ceremony. The couple have two sons and a daughter.
