= John Tollemache, 5th Baron Tollemache =

British peer (born 1939)

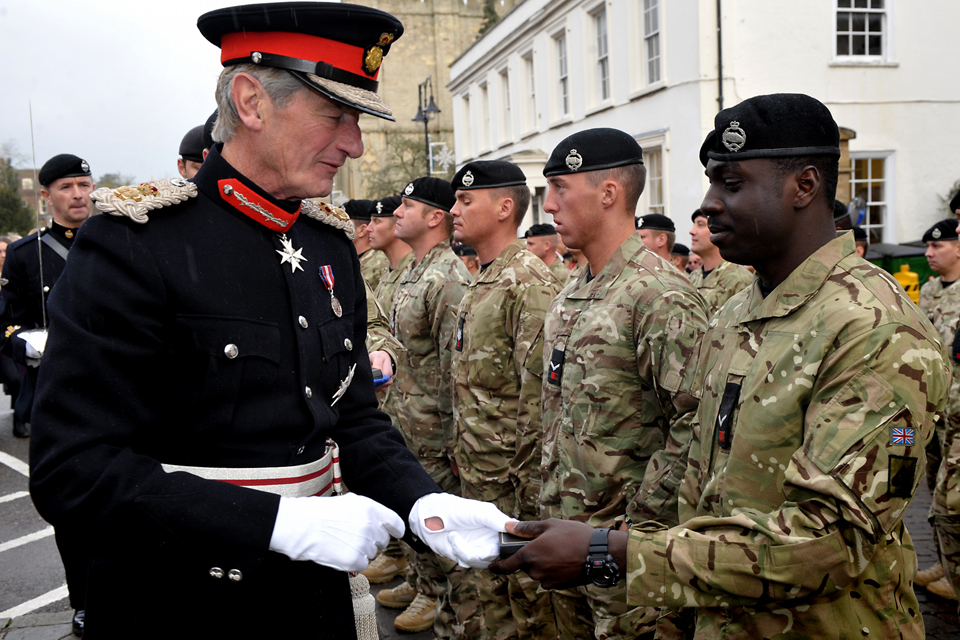
Lord Tollemache presenting medals in November 2012, when he was serving as Lord-Lieutenant of Suffolk

Timothy John Edward Tollemache, 5th Baron Tollemache KCVO (born 13 December 1939) is an English peer and landowner. He is the current owner of Helmingham Hall in Suffolk, the principal seat of the Tollemache family.

== Early life and education ==
Tollemache was born in Norwich, the eldest son of Major John Edward Hamilton Tollemache, 4th Baron Tollemache of the Coldstream Guards (1910–1975), and his wife, Dinah Jamieson, daughter of Sir Archibald Jamieson. His father succeeded his cousin as Baron Tollemache in 1955. He succeeded his father upon his death in 1975.

== Career ==
Tollemache served as Lord-Lieutenant of Suffolk from 2003 to 2014. Previously, he was Vice-Lieutenant of Suffolk from 1994 to 2003 and had been Deputy Lieutenant from 1984 to 1994. He is the patron or president of several organizations and societies.

Tollemache was appointed Knight Commander of the Royal Victorian Order (KCVO) in the 2015 New Year Honours.

== Marriage and family ==
Tollemache married Alexandra Dorothy Jean Meynell (or Maynell) in 1970. Lady Tollemache is a garden designer, working under the name Xa Tollemache. She supervises the gardens at Helmingham and has also worked on the Millennium Garden at Castle Hill in Devon, Dunbeath Castle in Scotland, and the Cloister Garden at Wilton House.

Lord and Lady Tollemache have the following issue:

- The Hon. Selina Karen Tollemache (born 3 October 1973) married James Hopkins on 11 September 2010. They have one daughter, Lily Alexandra Hopkins (2 April 2012).
- The Hon. Edward John Hugh Tollemache (born 12 May 1976), a godson of King Charles III, married Sophie Johnstone on 3 February 2007. They have three children.
- The Hon. James Henry Timothy Tollemache (born 28 August 1980) married Princess Florence of Prussia (born 1983), daughter of Prince Frederick Nicholas of Prussia, on 10 May 2014. They have one daughter, Sylvie Beatrice Selina Tollemache (2 March 2016)

Lord and Lady Tollemache are members of the Countryside Alliance and have opened their gardens to the public, although their house remains private. A portrait of Lady Tollemache by Tessa Traegar, commissioned in 2004, hangs in the National Portrait Gallery collections.

== Honours ==
- KCVO – appointed 2015.
- KStJ – appointed 2004.

== Coat of arms ==
Coat of arms of John Tollemache, 5th Baron Tollemache
Notes Coat of arms of the Tollemache family Coronet The coronet of a baron Crest A Horse's Head erased Argent between two Wings Or pellety Escutcheon Argent a Fret Sable Supporters On either side a Stag guardant proper gorged with a Collar flory counterflory Or Motto Confido Conquiesco (Latin for 'I trust and am content')

== See also ==
- Peckforton Castle
- Tollemache baronets
- Tollemache Brewery

== Footnotes ==
Honorary titles
Preceded by The Lord Belstead	Lord-Lieutenant of Suffolk; 2003–2014	Succeeded by Clare, Countess of Euston
Peerage of the United Kingdom
Preceded by John Tollemache	Baron Tollemache; 1975–present	Incumbent
