= Alexander Abel Smith =

Sir Alexander Abel Smith KCVO TD JP
- Born: 18 September 1904; Belgravia, London
- Died: 17 April 1980 (aged 75); Cirencester, Gloucestershire
- Occupations: British Army officer; Merchant banker
- Known for: Chairman of the Pressed Steel Company from 1955 to 1965
- Spouses: Elizabeth Morgan (m. 1936; died 1948) Henriette Cadogan (m. 1953)
- Relatives: Lucy Abel Smith (daughter-in-law)

Sir Alexander Abel Smith (18 September 1904 – 17 April 1980) was a British Army officer and merchant banker from the Smith banking family.

== Early life and education ==
Abel Smith was born at Chesham Place, Belgravia, the youngest son of Francis Abel Smith (1861–1908) of Wilford House, Nottinghamshire, and Madeline St Maur Seymour, daughter of Rev. Henry Seymour (1825-1911), a cousin of the Duke of Somerset. His elder brother was Col. Sir Henry Abel Smith, Governor of Queensland. He was educated at Eton College and Magdalen College, Oxford.

== Career ==
After university, Abel Smith worked in JP Morgan in New York.

Abel Smith served in Anti-Aircraft Command in World War II, and then joined the British Army Staff, Washington. He was an honorary Brigadier in the British Army. From about 1946 he was a partner in J. Henry Schroder Wagg. He was Chairman of the Pressed Steel Company from 1955 to 1965 and of Provident Mutual Life Assurance Association Ltd. from 1966 to 1973.

== Personal life ==
Abel Smith married in 1936 Elizabeth Morgan, who died in 1948. Secondly, he was the second husband of Henriette, Lady Abel Smith, Lady-in-Waiting to Queen Elizabeth II. His son, engineer David Francis Abel Smith, married author Lucy Abel Smith.

Abel Smith resided at Quenington Old Rectory, in Cirencester. In 1980, he died suddenly after a fall.
