= Tollemache Brewery =

Brewery company in East Anglia, England

Tollemache Breweries Ltd. was a brewing company which originated in Ipswich in 1888 and became a major brewer in East Anglia before merging with their rival Cobbold and Co. to form Tolly Cobbold in 1957. The brewery was founded by three sons of John Tollemache, 1st Baron Tollemache - Douglas, Stanhope and Mortimer Tollemache - who bought the Cullingham Brewery in Upper Brooke Street. This had been established as a Steam Brewery in 1856 by Charles Cullingham. Douglas Tollemache was keen to ensure a high quality product.

== Tollies Follies ==
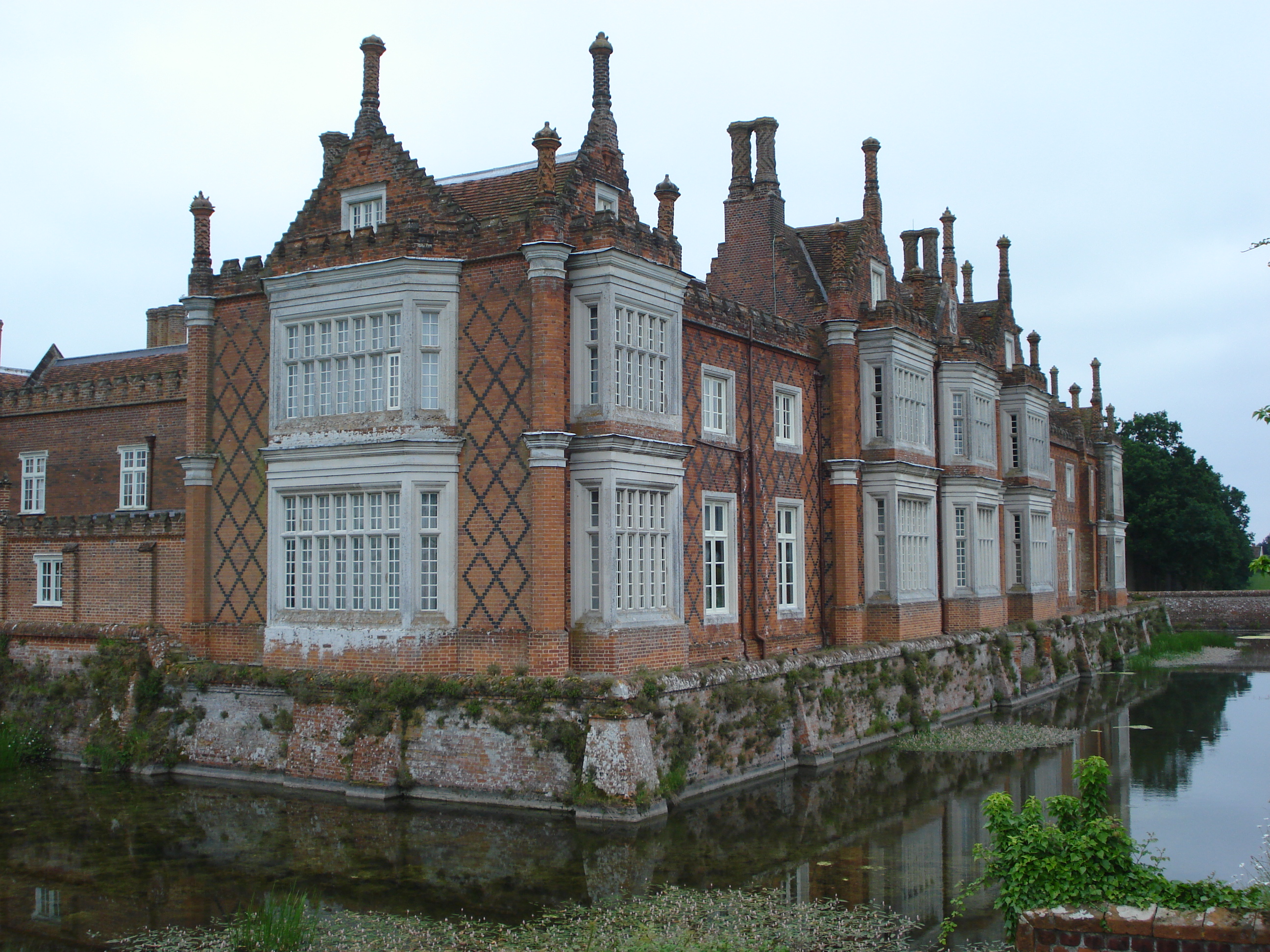
Helmingham Hall, model for the Tollies Follies public houses

Tollies Follies was an epithet given to a series of pubs built by Tollemache Brewery primarily in their home town of Ipswich. They were designed by the architect John Shewell Corder and modelled on Helmingham Hall, a moated manor house located in Helmingham, Suffolk, about 10 miles north of Ipswich. This building had been started by John Tollemache – an ancestor of the Tollemache brothers in 1480. The building had remained in the ownership of the Tollemache family ever since. The building exterior has been altered several times including by the architect John Nash in 1800.

Most survive, though some, notably The Golden Hind in Cambridge, which was the only Tolly Folly outside of Ipswich, underwent major alteration in the 1980s. The Waveney Arms on Bramford Road in Ipswich closed in 1994 and was run as a private club until 2004. It was demolished for housing in August 2007. The Safe Harbour, Meredith Road, closed in 1997, and was subsequently demolished and the site developed as a retail outlet.

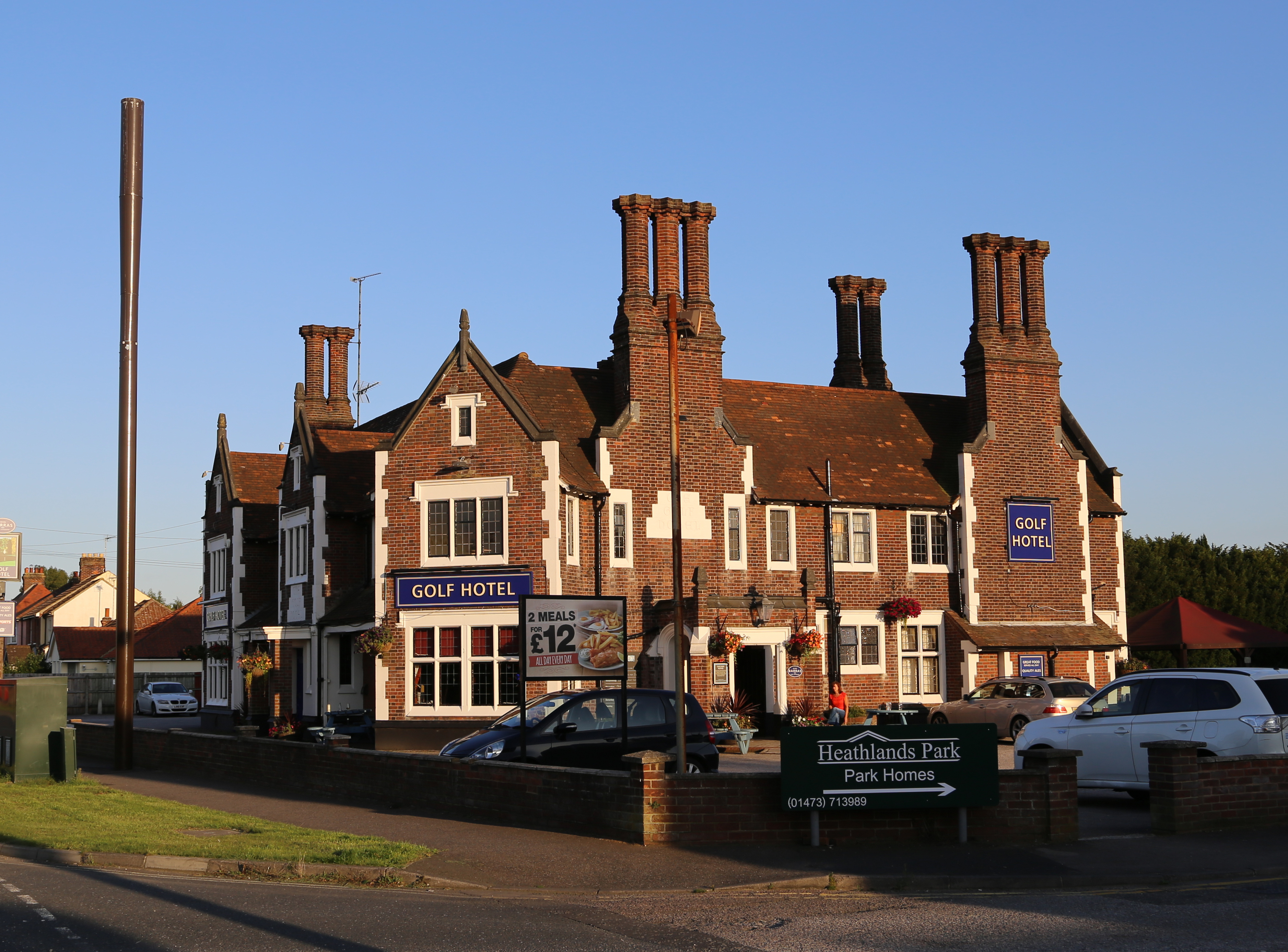
Golf Hotel, Rushmere St Andrews

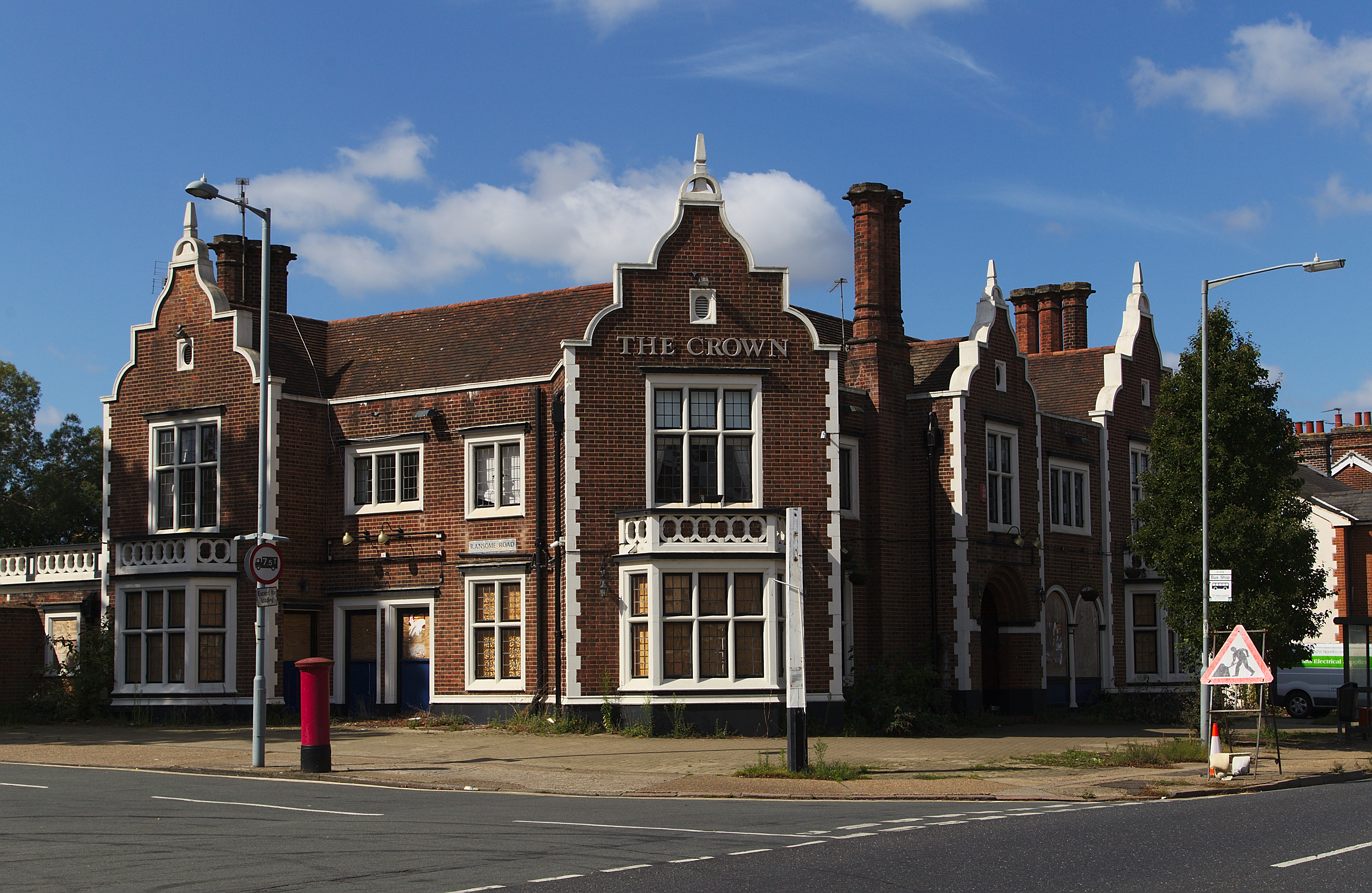
The Crown, Felixstowe Road (now flats)

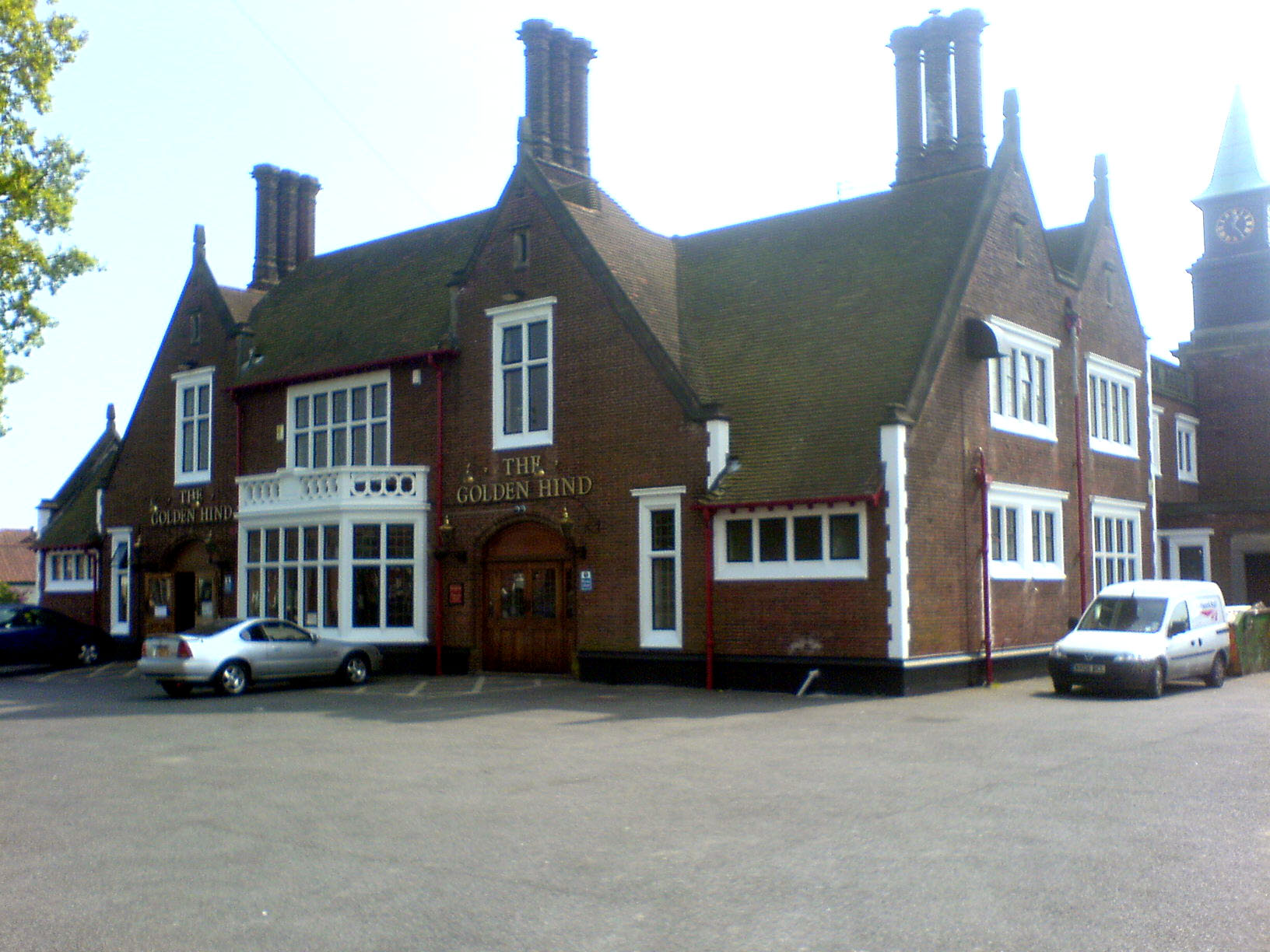
Golden Hind, Nacton Road

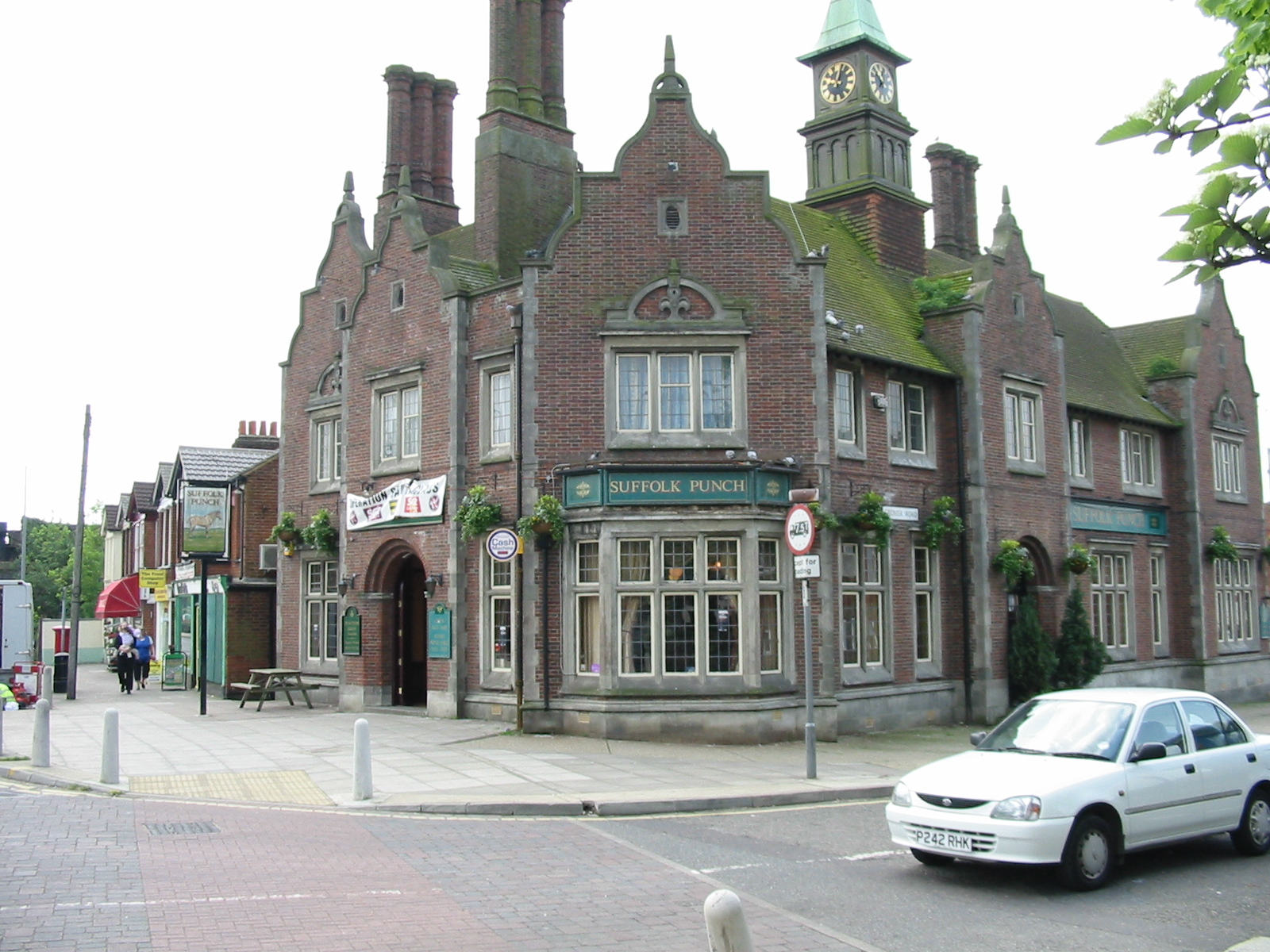
Suffolk Punch, Deben Road

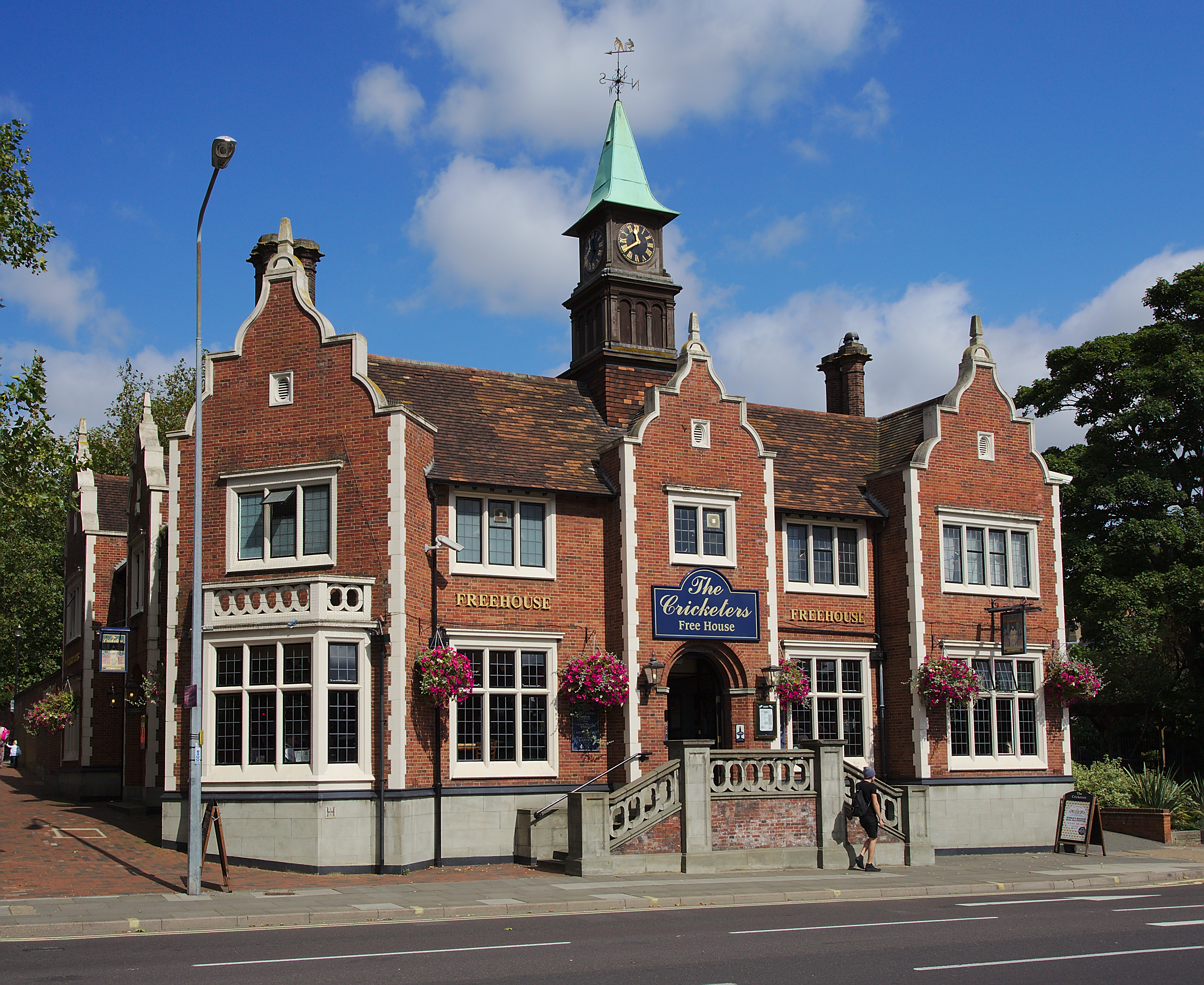
The Cricketers, Crown Street

== Trails that lead to "Tolly" ==
The first edition of Trails that lead to "Tolly" was published by E. J. Burrow & Co. of Cheltenham for Tollemanahes Breweries in the 1930s.
