= List of former United Kingdom Parliament constituencies =

This is a list of former parliamentary constituencies in the United Kingdom, organised by date of abolition. It includes UK parliamentary constituencies that have been abolished, including those that were later recreated, but does not include constituencies that were merely renamed.

The date of creation of a constituency, in some cases, goes back to English and Welsh seats in the Parliament of England and the Scottish constituencies in the Parliament of Great Britain.

In some cases, constituencies in the unreformed House of Commons first received a summons to send representatives to Parliament at a date considerably earlier than the date after which they consistently received a summons. These cases are indicated in a note.

No account is taken, in this article, of the temporary redistribution of constituencies used for the First and Second Protectorate Parliaments in the 1650s. See First Protectorate Parliament for a list of those constituencies.

== Constituencies abolished in 2024 ==
- Aberavon
- Aberconwy
- Angus
- Arfon
- Argyll and Bute
- Banff and Buchan
- Barnsley Central
- Barnsley East
- Batley and Spen
- Beckenham
- Belfast South
- Berwick-upon-Tweed
- Bethnal Green and Bow
- Birmingham Hall Green
- Birmingham Hodge Hill
- Blackley and Broughton
- Blackpool North and Cleveleys
- Blaenau Gwent
- Blaydon
- Blyth Valley
- Bolton South East
- Bosworth
- Brecon and Radnorshire
- Brent Central
- Brent North
- Bridgwater and West Somerset
- Brigg and Goole
- Brighton Kemptown
- Bristol West
- Broadland
- Bromley and Chislehurst
- Buckingham
- Burton
- Bury St Edmunds
- Camberwell and Peckham
- Cardiff Central
- Carmarthen East and Dinefwr
- Carmarthen West and South Pembrokeshire
- Ceredigion
- Charnwood
- City of Chester
- Cleethorpes
- Clwyd South
- Clwyd West
- Coatbridge, Chryston and Bellshill
- Copeland
- Corby
- Coventry North East
- Croydon Central
- Croydon North
- Cumbernauld, Kilsyth and Kirkintilloch East
- Cynon Valley
- Delyn
- Denton and Reddish
- Devizes
- Dewsbury
- Don Valley
- Dover
- Dudley North
- Dudley South
- Dundee East
- Dundee West
- Dunfermline and West Fife
- East Devon
- East Dunbartonshire
- East Kilbride, Strathaven and Lesmahagow
- East Lothian
- East Yorkshire
- Eddisbury
- Edinburgh East
- Edmonton
- Ellesmere Port and Neston
- Elmet and Rothwell
- Eltham
- Enfield Southgate
- Fareham
- Garston and Halewood
- Gateshead
- Glasgow Central
- Glasgow North West
- Glenrothes
- Gordon
- Grantham and Stamford
- Great Grimsby
- Halesowen and Rowley Regis
- Haltemprice and Howden
- Halton
- Hammersmith
- Hampstead and Kilburn
- Harborough
- Hemsworth
- Henley
- Heywood and Middleton
- Hitchin and Harpenden
- Hornsey and Wood Green
- Hove
- Inverclyde
- Inverness, Nairn, Badenoch and Strathspey
- Isle of Wight
- Islwyn
- Jarrow
- Keighley
- Kensington
- Kingston upon Hull North
- Kingston upon Hull West and Hessle
- Kingswood
- Kirkcaldy and Cowdenbeath
- Lanark and Hamilton East
- Lancaster and Fleetwood
- Leeds Central
- Leeds West
- Leigh
- Lewisham Deptford
- Lewisham West and Penge
- Linlithgow and East Falkirk
- Ludlow
- Luton South
- Maidstone and The Weald
- Manchester Gorton
- Meon Valley
- Meriden
- Merthyr Tydfil and Rhymney
- Mid Worcestershire
- Middlesbrough
- Milton Keynes South
- Mole Valley
- Monmouth
- Montgomeryshire
- Moray
- Morley and Outwood
- Motherwell and Wishaw
- Neath
- Newcastle upon Tyne Central
- Newcastle upon Tyne East
- Newport West
- Normanton, Pontefract and Castleford
- North East Bedfordshire
- North East Somerset
- North Swindon
- North Thanet
- North Tyneside
- North Warwickshire
- North West Durham
- North Wiltshire
- Nottingham North
- Ochil and South Perthshire
- Ogmore
- Oldham West and Royton
- Pendle
- Penrith and The Border
- Perth and North Perthshire
- Preseli Pembrokeshire
- Pudsey
- Reading East
- Reading West
- Rhondda
- Richmond (Yorks)
- Rochford and Southend East
- Ross, Skye and Lochaber
- Rutherglen and Hamilton West
- Rutland and Melton
- Saffron Walden
- Salford and Eccles
- Sedgefield
- Selby and Ainsty
- Sherwood
- Shrewsbury and Atcham
- Solihull
- Somerton and Frome
- South East Cambridgeshire
- South Staffordshire
- South Swindon
- South Thanet
- South West Bedfordshire
- South West Surrey
- Southend West
- Stirling
- Stockton South
- Stone
- Streatham
- Swansea East
- Taunton Deane
- The Cotswolds
- Tiverton and Honiton
- Tonbridge and Malling
- Torridge and West Devon
- Totnes
- Vale of Clwyd
- Vauxhall
- Wakefield
- Walsall North
- Walsall South
- Wansbeck
- Wantage
- Warley
- Washington and Sunderland West
- Waveney
- Wealden
- Weaver Vale
- Wellingborough
- Wells
- Wentworth and Dearne
- West Bromwich East
- West Bromwich West
- West Ham
- Westminster North
- Wirral South
- Wolverhampton South West
- Workington
- Worsley and Eccles
- Wyre and Preston North

== Constituencies abolished in 2010 ==
	Created	Notes
Barnsley West and Penistone	1983	
Barnsley East and Mexborough	1997	
Birmingham Sparkbrook and Small Heath	1997	
Blackpool North and Fleetwood	1997	
Bradford North	1918	
Brent East	1974	
Brent South	1974	
Eccles	1885	
Hammersmith and Fulham	1997	
Kensington and Chelsea	1997	
Knowsley North and Sefton East	1997	
Lancaster and Wyre	1997	
Meirionnydd Nant Conwy	1983	
Normanton	1885	
Poplar and Canning Town	1997	
Rugby and Kenilworth	1983	
Sheffield Hillsborough	1918	
Tyne Bridge	1983	
Vale of York	1997	

== Constituencies abolished in 2005 ==
The Scottish UK Parliamentary constituencies were reorganised following the creation of the Scottish Parliament, in order to remove the traditional over-representation put in place to compensate for the lack of national representation.

	Created	Notes
Aberdeen Central	1997	
Ayr	1950	
Carrick, Cumnock and Doon Valley	1983	Divided between Ayr, Carrick and Cumnock and Central Ayrshire
Coatbridge and Chryston	1997	
Clydebank and Milngavie	1983	
Clydesdale	1983	
Cunninghame North	1983	
Cunninghame South	1983	
Dumbarton	1983	Divided between Dunbartonshire West and Argyll and Bute
Dumfriesshire	1708	
Dunfermline East	1983	
Dunfermline West	1983	
Eastwood	1983	
Edinburgh Central	1885	
Edinburgh East and Musselburgh	1997	
Edinburgh Pentlands	1950	
Falkirk East	1983	
Falkirk West	1983	
Fife Central	1974	
Galloway and Upper Nithsdale	1983	
Glasgow Anniesland	1997	
Glasgow Baillieston	1997	
Glasgow Cathcart	1918	
Glasgow Govan	1885	
Glasgow Kelvin	1997	
Glasgow Maryhill	1918	
Glasgow Pollok	1918	
Glasgow Rutherglen	1918	Rutherglen 1918 to 1983; Glasgow Rutherglen 1983 to 2005
Glasgow Shettleston	1918	
Glasgow Springburn	1918	
Greenock and Inverclyde	1997	
Hamilton North and Bellshill	1997	
Hamilton South	1997	
Inverness East, Nairn and Lochaber	1983	
Kirkcaldy	1832	
Linlithgow	1708	Linlithgowshire 1708 to 1945; West Lothian 1945 to 1983; Linlithgow 1983 to 2005
Paisley North	1983	
Paisley South	1983	
Perth	1997	
Renfrewshire West (1997 to 2005)	1997	Second creation. First abolished in 1983
Ross, Skye and Inverness West	1997	
Roxburgh and Berwickshire	1983	

== Constituencies abolished in 1997 ==
The Boundary Commissions' Fourth Periodical Review was completed in 1995. It recommended various changes, although most of the abolitions resulting from these took place in Scotland.

	Created	Notes
East Angus	1983	Northern half merged with Tayside North and coastal half renamed Angus
Boothferry	1983	Southern section merged with Glanford and Scunthorpe to create Brigg and Goole, middle section merged with southern half of Beverley to create Haltemprice and Howden, northern section merged with northern Bridlington to create East Yorkshire
Bow and Poplar	1983	
Bridlington	1950	Majority incorporated into new Beverley and Holderness seat.
Caithness and Sutherland	1918	Merged with part of Ross, Cromarty and Skye to form Caithness, Sutherland and Easter Ross
Carmarthen	1542	
Chelmsford	1885	Revived in 2010
Chelsea	1868	
Chertsey and Walton	1974	
Cirencester and Tewkesbury	1918	Divided into Tewkesbury and Cotswold
Clackmannan	1983	Merged with southern parts of Perth and Kinross to form Ochil
Clwyd North West	1983	
Colchester North	1983	Split into Essex North and Colchester
Colchester South and Maldon	1983	Rural parts merged with half of Chelmsford to create Maldon and Chelmsford East, remainder becoming part of Colchester
Coventry South East	1974	
Coventry South West	1974	
Croydon North East	1955	
Croydon North West	1955	
Dudley East	1974	
Dudley West	1974	
East Berkshire	1983	
East Lindsey	1983	
Fulham (1955 to 1997)	1955	Second creation. First abolished in 1918
Glasgow Garscadden	1974	Replaced by Glasgow Anniesland
Glasgow Central	1885	Recreated 2005
Glasgow Hillhead	1918	Replaced by Glasgow Kelvin
Glasgow Provan	1955	
Gloucestershire West	1950	Second creation. First abolished 1885; Replaced by Forest of Dean
Hamilton	1918	Most of constituency became Hamilton South, remainder merged with Motherwell South to become Hamilton North and Bellshill
Hendon North	1945	
Hendon South	1945	
Holland with Boston	1918	Replaced by Boston and Skegness and South Holland and The Deepings
Kincardine and Deeside	1983	Replaced by West Aberdeenshire and Kincardine
Langbaurgh	1983	Succeeded by Middlesbrough South and East Cleveland
Littleborough and Saddleworth	1983	
Liverpool Broadgreen	1983	
Liverpool Mossley Hill	1983	
Mid Staffordshire	1983	
Monklands East	1983	
Monklands West	1983	
Motherwell North	1983	
Motherwell South	1983	Most of constituency became part of Hamilton North and Bellshill
Newcastle-upon-Tyne East	1918	Revived in 2010
New Forest	1885	New Forest and Christchurch from 1918 until 1950. Replaced by New Forest East and New Forest West.
Newham North East	1974	All of the constituency became part of East Ham
Newham North West	1974	All of the constituency became part of West Ham
Newham South	1974	Bulk of constituency split between East Ham and West Ham with a small part going into Poplar and Canning Town
Norwood	1885	
North Bedfordshire	1983	
North Hertfordshire	1983	
North West Surrey	1974	Succeeded by Surrey Heath
Plymouth Drake (1974 to 1997)	1974	Second creation. First creation 1918 to 1950
Ravensbourne	1974	
Richmond and Barnes	1983	Enlarged and renamed Richmond Park
Ross, Cromarty and Skye	1983	Replaced by Ross, Skye and Inverness West
Salford East	1950	Enlarged and renamed Salford
South East Staffordshire	1983	Effectively renamed Tamworth
Southend East	1950	Became Rochford and Southend East
South Hams	1983	
South West Cambridgeshire	1983	
South West Clwyd	1983	
South Worcestershire	1950	
Swindon	1918	Split to form Swindon North and Swindon South
Wallsend	1918	Lost its eponymous town with most of the remainder becoming North Tyneside
Wanstead and Woodford	1964	
Warley East	1974	Merged with half of Warley West to become Warley
Warley West	1974	Split between Warley and Halesowen and Rowley Regis
West Hertfordshire	1983	succeeded by Hemel Hempstead
Westminster North	1983	Recreated at the 2010 general election
Worthing	1945	

== Constituencies abolished in 1992 ==
Due to the rapid expansion, the town of Milton Keynes, the Boundary Commission for England exceptionally recommended in 1990, between reviews, that it should be divided between two new constituencies.

	Created	Notes
Milton Keynes	1983	Split between Milton Keynes South West and North East Milton Keynes

== Constituencies abolished in 1983 ==
The Boundary Commissions' Third Periodical Review was completed in 1983, fourteen years after the previous review. It proposed wider changes than the two earlier reviews and abolished a large number of constituencies, although many constituencies were simply renamed to conform to local government districts created in 1974.

	Created	Notes
Aberdare	1918	
Aberdeenshire East	1950	
Aberdeenshire West	1950	Replaced by Kincardine and Deeside
Abertillery	1918	
Accrington	1885	
North Angus and Mearns	1950	
South Angus	1950	
Argyll	1708	Argyllshire 1708 to 1950; Argyll 1950 to 1983
Armagh	1922	Split between Newry and Armagh and Upper Bann
Central Ayrshire	1950	Became Cunninghame South but recreated in 2005
South Ayrshire	1868	Renamed Carrick, Cumnock and Doon Valley
Banffshire	1708	Merged into Moray and Banff and Buchan
Barkston Ash	1885	
Barnsley	1885	Split into Barnsley Central, Barnsley East and Barnsley West and Penistone
Barry	1950	Most of the constituency became Vale of Glamorgan
Batley and Morley	1918	
Battersea North	1918	Merged (minus some of Battersea South, which went into Tooting) to form Battersea
Battersea South	1918	Merged (minus some of Battersea South, which went into Tooting) to form Battersea
Bebington and Ellesmere Port	1974	
Bedford	1295	
Bedwellty	1918	
Beeston	1974	Replaced by Broxtowe
Belper	1918	
Bermondsey	1885	
Berwick and East Lothian	1950	
Birmingham Stechford	1950	
Bodmin	1295	Became North Cornwall
Bolton East	1950	
Bothwell	1918	
Brigg and Scunthorpe	1974	
Brighouse and Spenborough	1950	
Bristol North East	1950	
Bristol South East	1950	
Bromsgrove and Redditch	1974	
Bury and Radcliffe	1950	
Bute and North Ayrshire	1918	Split between Argyll and Bute and Cunninghame North
Cambridgeshire	1918	First creation 1290–1885
Cardiff North West	1974	
Cardiff South East	1950	
Carlton	1950	
Chester-le-Street	1885	
Christchurch and Lymington	1974	
Clackmannan and Eastern Stirlingshire	1885	
Cleveland and Whitby	1974	
Clitheroe	1559	
Coatbridge and Airdrie	1950	
Colchester	1295	
Consett	1918	
Dunbartonshire Central	1974	
Darwen	1885	
Dearne Valley	1950	
Denbigh	1542	
Doncaster	1885	
Dorking	1950	Succeeded by Mole Valley
Dover and Deal	1974	
Dunfermline	1918	
East Dunbartonshire	1950	Revived in 2005
East Grinstead	1885	Second creation. First abolished in 1832
East Hertfordshire	1955	
Ebbw Vale	1918	
Edinburgh North	1918	
Essex South East	1955	Second creation. First creation 1885 to 1945; Replaced by Castle Point
Eton and Slough	1945	
Eye	1571	Replaced by Central Suffolk
Farnham	1918	Succeeded by Surrey South West
Farnworth	1885	
Fife East	1885	
Flintshire East	1950	
Flintshire West	1950	
Fylde North	1950	
Fylde South	1950	
Gateshead West	1950	
Glasgow Craigton	1955	
Glasgow Kelvingrove	1918	
Glasgow Queen's Park	1974	
Gloucestershire South	1950	
Goole	1950	
Gravesend	1868	
Hackney Central	1885	Abolished 1950–1955
Haltemprice	1950	
Hammersmith North	1918	Replaced by Hammersmith
Hampstead	1885	
Handsworth	1885	
Harrow Central	1950	
Hemel Hempstead	1918	Renamed West Hertfordshire; Revived 1997
Hitchin	1885	
Holborn and St Pancras South	1950	
Horncastle	1885	
Hornsey	1885	Western part went to Finchley in 1918.
Horsham and Crawley	1974	Split into Horsham and Crawley
Howden	1955	
Huddersfield East	1950	
Huddersfield West	1950	
Huntingdonshire	1918	First creation 1290–1885
Huyton	1950	
Ilkeston	1885	
Ince	1885	
Isle of Ely	1918	Succeeded by North East Cambridgeshire
Islington Central	1974	
Kidderminster	1832	Succeeded by Wyre Forest
Kilmarnock	1918	Merged into Kilmarnock and Loudoun
Kingston upon Hull Central	1974	Second creation. First creation 1885 to 1955
Kinross and Western	1918	
Knutsford	1885	
Lambeth Central	1974	
Lanark	1918	Second creation. First creation 1708 to 1832
Leeds South	1885	
Leeds South East	1918	
Leek	1885	Succeeded by Staffordshire Moorlands
Lichfield and Tamworth	1950	
Liverpool Edge Hill	1918	
Liverpool Kirkdale	1885	
Liverpool Scotland Exchange	1974	
Liverpool Toxteth	1950	
Liverpool Wavertree	1918	Revived in 1997
Louth (Lincolnshire)	1885	
Lowestoft	1885	
Luton East	1974	
Luton West	1974	
Maldon	1332	Recreated in 2010
Manchester Ardwick	1918	
Manchester Moss Side	1918	
Manchester Openshaw	1955	
Melton	1885	
Middleton and Prestwich	1918	
Mid Oxfordshire	1974	
Moray and Nairn	1918	Split into Moray and Inverness, Nairn and Lochaber.
Morpeth	1553	
Motherwell and Wishaw	1974	Split into Motherwell North and Motherwell South. Revived in 1997.
Nantwich	1955	
Nelson and Colne	1918	
Newcastle-upon-Tyne West	1918	
Newport (Monmouthshire)	1918	Split into Newport East and Newport West.
Newton (Lancashire)	1885	Second creation. First abolished in 1832
North Lanarkshire	1918	Second creation. First creation 1868 to 1885
North Somerset	1950	Second creation. First creation 1885 to 1918, recreated in 2010
Northwich	1885	
Nottingham West	1885	
Oldham East	1950	
Ormskirk	1885	
Oswestry	1885	
Oxford	1295	Split into Oxford West and Abingdon and Oxford East.
Paddington	1974	
Paisley	1832	Split into Paisley North and Paisley South.
Penistone	1918	
Petersfield	1547	First represented 1307
Pontypool	1918	
Preston North	1950	
Preston South	1950	
Reading North	1974	Second creation. First creation 1950 to 1955
Reading South	1974	Second creation. First creation 1950 to 1955
Renfrewshire East	1885	Revived 2005
Ripon	1530	First represented 1295
Rochester and Chatham	1950	
Rugby	1885	Revived in 2010
Runcorn	1950	
Ross and Cromarty	1832	
Rye	1955	Second creation. First abolished in 1950
St Helens	1885	Split into St Helens North and St Helens South
St Marylebone	1918	
St Pancras North	1885	
Salford West	1885	
Sheffield Park	1918	Replaced by Sheffield Central
Shrewsbury	1290	
Sidcup	1974	
South Bedfordshire	1950	
South East Derbyshire	1950	
South Hertfordshire	1974	
South West Staffordshire	1974	
Sowerby	1885	
Stepney and Poplar	1974	
Stirling, Falkirk and Grangemouth	1974	
Stockport North	1950	Merged to form Stockport
Stockport South	1950	Merged to form Stockport (UK Parliament constituency)
Stockton	1950	
Sudbury and Woodbridge	1950	
Thanet East	1974	
Thanet West	1974	
Thirsk and Malton	1885	Revived in 2010
Thornaby	1974	
Totnes	1885	Second creation. First abolished 1868; Revived again in 1997
Warrington	1832	Split into Warrington North and Warrington South
West Devon	1974	
West Dunbartonshire	1950	Replaced by Dumbarton (UK Parliament constituency), recreated 2005
Westhoughton	1885	
West Lothian	1945	Split into Livingston and Linlithgow
West Stirlingshire	1945	
Whitehaven	1832	Replaced by Copeland
Widnes	1885	Replaced by Halton
Wirral	1885	Split into Wirral South and Wirral West
Wood Green	1918	
Woolwich East	1918	Reunited to form Woolwich
Woolwich West	1918	Reunited to form Woolwich

== Constituencies abolished in 1974 ==
The Boundary Commissions' Second Periodical Review was completed in 1969, but not implemented until the February 1974 election. Many of the constituencies it abolished were in inner city areas, which were losing population.

	Created	Notes
Arundel and Shoreham	1950	Split into Arundel and Shoreham
Barons Court	1955	Divided between Fulham and Hammersmith North
Bexley	1945	
Billericay	1950	Revived 1983–2010
Bilston	1918	
Birmingham All Saints	1955	
Birmingham Aston	1918	
Bradford East	1885	Revived 2010
Brierley Hill	1950	
Bristol Central	1918	
Brixton	1885	
Bromley	1918	
Chigwell	1955	
Clapham	1885	
Coventry East	1945	
Coventry North	1950	
Coventry South	1950	Revived 1997
Croydon South	1955	largely renamed Croydon Central, new Croydon South created further south
Dudley	1832	Split into Dudley East and Dudley West.
Ealing South	1950	
East Ham North	1918	
East Ham South	1918	
Enfield East	1950	
Enfield West	1950	
Epping	1885	
Fife West	1885	
Glasgow Bridgeton	1885	
Glasgow Gorbals	1918	
Glasgow Woodside	1950	
Heston and Isleworth	1945	
Islington East	1885	
Islington Southwest	1950	
Kensington North	1885	
Kensington South	1885	
King's Lynn	1298	
Kingston upon Hull North	1950	Strictly Kingston upon Hull North. Revived 1983
Leicester North East	1950	Reformed as Leicester East, Leicester South and Leicester West
Leicester North West	1950	Reformed as Leicester East, Leicester South and Leicester West
Leicester South East	1950	Reformed as Leicester East, Leicester South and Leicester West
Leicester South West	1950	Reformed as Leicester East, Leicester South and Leicester West
Lewisham North	1950	
Lewisham South	1950	
Luton	1885	Split into Luton East and Luton West
Manchester Cheetham	1950	
Manchester Exchange	1918	
Merton and Morden	1950	
Middlesbrough East	1918	
Middlesbrough West	1918	
Norfolk Central	1950	
Northampton	1295	Split into Northampton North and Northampton South
Nottingham Central	1918	
Nottingham South	1885	Revived 1983
Paddington North	1885	Merged into Paddington
Paddington South	1885	Merged into Paddington
Poplar	1950	Second creation. First creation 1885 to 1918
Portsmouth Langstone	1950	
Portsmouth West	1950	
Reading	1955	First creation 1295–1950
Rhondda East	1918	
Rhondda West	1918	
Rowley Regis and Tipton	1950	
Sedgefield	1918	Revived 1983
Smethwick	1918	
South Buckinghamshire	1950	
South Northamptonshire	1950	Second creation. First creation 1832 to 1918
Southwark	1950	First creation 1295–1885
Tavistock	1330	First represented 1295
Torquay	1885	
Torrington	1950	
Walthamstow East	1918	Merged into Walthamstow
Walthamstow West	1918	Merged into Walthamstow
Wandsworth Central	1918	
Wednesbury	1868	
Wembley North	1945	
Wembley South	1945	
West Bromwich	1885	Split into West Bromwich East and West Bromwich West.
West Ham North	1950	Second creation. First creation 1885 to 1918
West Ham South	1950	Second creation. First creation 1885 to 1918
Willesden East	1918	
Willesden West	1918	

== Constituencies abolished in 1955 ==
The Boundary Commissions completed their First Periodical Reviews in 1954, as required by the 1944 act. These reviews controversially recommended further abolitions and creations, including the abolition of some constituencies created only in 1950.

	Created	Notes
Beverley	1950	First creation 1563–1870; Third creation 1983–97
Birmingham Erdington	1918	Revived 1974
Blackburn East	1950	Reunited as Blackburn
Blackburn West	1950	Reunited as Blackburn
Bradford Central	1885	
Broxtowe	1918	Revived 1983
Croydon East	1950	
Croydon North	1918	
Croydon West	1950	
Droylsden	1950	
Fulham East	1918	Divided between Fulham and Barons Court
Fulham West	1918	Divided between Fulham and Barons Court
King's Norton	1918	
Glasgow Camlachie	1885	
Glasgow Tradeston	1885	
Hackney South	1885	
Hammersmith South	1918	
Kingston upon Hull Central	1885	Strictly Kingston upon Hull Central. Revived 1974–1983
Leeds Central	1885	Revived 1983
Leeds North	1885	
Manchester Clayton	1918	
Midlothian and Peebles	1950	
Nottingham East (1950 to 1955)	1885	Revived 1974
Nottingham North West	1950	
Reading North (1950 to 1955)	1950	Revived 1974 to 1983
Reading South (1950 to 1955)	1950	Revived 1974 to 1983
Sheffield Neepsend	1950	
Walsall	1832	Split into Walsall North and Walsall South

== Constituencies abolished in 1950 ==
The Boundary Commissions completed their Initial Review of Parliamentary Constituencies in 1947. This recommended a number of changes in order that the populations of constituencies ordinarily varied no more than 25% from an electoral quota.

As well, multi-member constituencies (the university constituencies) were abolished by the Representation of the People Act, 1948.

	Created	Notes
Aberdeen and Kincardine East	1918	
Aberdeen and Kincardine Central	1918	
Antrim	1922	Second creation. First creation 1801 to 1885; Split into Antrim North and Antrim South
Ayr District of Burghs	1708	Components, as defined 1918, merged into Ayr, Bute and North Ayrshire and Central Ayrshire
Balham and Tooting	1918	
Barnard Castle	1885	Divided between Bishop Auckland and Durham North West
Barnstaple	1295	
Bermondsey West	1918	
Berwickshire and Haddingtonshire	1918	Renamed Berwickshire and East Lothian 1950–74 and Berwick and East Lothian 1974–83
Bethnal Green North East	1885	
Bethnal Green South West	1885	
Bewdley	1605	
Birkenhead East	1918	
Birkenhead West	1918	
Birmingham Acock's Green	1945	
Birmingham Deritend	1918	
Birmingham Duddeston	1918	
Birmingham West	1885	
Blackburn	1832	Second creation from 1955
Bolton	1832	
Bournemouth	1918	
Bow and Bromley	1885	
Brighton	1832	
Bristol East	1885	Second creation from 1983
Bristol North	1885	
Bucklow	1945	
Buckrose	1885	Divided between Bridlington and Beverley
Burslem	1918	
Bury	1832	Replaced by Bury and Radcliffe.
Caernarvonshire	1918	First creation 1542–1885
Camberwell North	1885	
Camberwell North West	1918	
Cambridge University	1604	
Cardiff Central	1918	Second creation from 1983
Cardiff East	1918	
Cardiff South	1918	
Clay Cross	1918	
Combined English Universities	1918	
Combined Scottish Universities	1918	
Coventry West	1945	
Croydon South	1918	Second creation from 1955
Daventry	1918	Second creation from 1974
Derby	1295	
Down	1922	Second creation. First creation from 1801 to 1885; Split into Down North and Down South
Dumbarton Burghs	1918	Split between Dunbartonshire East and Dunbartonshire West.
Dunbartonshire	1708	Split between Dunbartonshire East and Dunbartonshire West
Dundee	1832	Split into Dundee East and Dundee West.
Ealing East	1945	
Ealing West	1945	
East Dorset	1885	
East Toxteth	1885	
Eddisbury	1885	Second creation 1983
Elland	1885	A large part went to the new Brighouse and Spenborough constituency
Enfield	1885	Split into Enfield East and Enfield West.
Essex South East	1885	Revived 1955–1983
Evesham	1604	First represented 1295.
Fermanagh and Tyrone	1922	Divided between Fermanagh and South Tyrone and Mid Ulster
Flintshire	1542	Split into Flintshire East and Flintshire West
Forest of Dean	1885	Second creation 1997
Forfarshire	1708	Divided between South Angus and Angus North and Mearns (both abolished 1983)
Frome	1832	
Fylde	1918	Divided between Fylde North, Fylde South, Preston North, Preston South and Clitheroe; A new Fylde was created in 1983
Gateshead	1832	Split into Gateshead East and Gateshead West
Glasgow Partick	1918	
Glasgow St Rollox	1885	
Hackney Central	1885	Second creation 1955–83
Hackney North	1885	
Hanley	1885	
Holderness	1885	
Howdenshire	1885	
Huddersfield	1832	Second creation from 1983
Islington South	1885	
Islington West	1885	
Kennington	1885	
Kincardine and Aberdeenshire West	1918	
Kingston upon Hull North West	1918	Strictly Kingston upon Hull North West
Kingston upon Hull South West	1918	Strictly Kingston upon Hull South West
Kingswinford	1885	
Lambeth North	1885	
Leicester East	1918	Second creation from 1974
Leicester South	1918	Second creation from 1974
Leicester West	1918	Second creation from 1974
Lewisham East	1918	Second creation from 1974
Leyton East	1918	
Leyton West	1918	
Limehouse	1885	
Liverpool Everton	1885	
Liverpool Fairfield	1918	
Liverpool West Toxteth	1885	
Llandaff and Barry	1918	
London City (of)	1298	Merged into Cities of London and Westminster
London University	1868	
Lonsdale	1918	Divided between Morecambe and Lonsdale and Lancaster
Manchester Hulme	1918	
Manchester Platting	1918	
Manchester Rusholme	1918	
Montrose District of Burghs	1832	Divided between Angus South and North Angus and Mearns
Mile End	1885	
Norfolk East	1885	First creation 1832–68
North Cumberland	1918	Merged into Penrith and the Border
Norwich	1298	Split into Norwich North and Norwich South
Oldham	1832	Split into Oldham East and Oldham West
Oxford University	1604	
Penrith and Cockermouth	1918	Divided between Penrith and the Border and Workington
Penryn and Falmouth	1832	Renamed (Penryn from 1547)
Plaistow	1918	
Plymouth Drake	1918	Divided between Plymouth Devonport and Plymouth Sutton. Second creation 1974–97.
Poplar South	1918	
Portsmouth Central	1918	
Portsmouth North (1918 to 1950)	1918	Second creation from 1974
Preston	1529	First represented 1295. Split into Preston North and Preston South. Reunited 1983
Queen's University Belfast	1918	
Reading	1295	Split into Reading North and Reading South. Reunited 1955–74
Rotherhithe	1885	
Rothwell	1918	
Royton	1918	
Rye	1366	Second creation 1955–83
St Pancras South East	1918	
St Pancras South West	1918	
Salford North	1885	
Salford South	1885	
Seaham	1918	
Sheffield Central	1885	Second creation from 1983
Sheffield Ecclesall	1885	
Silvertown	1918	
South Derbyshire	1832	Second creation from 1983
Southend	1918	Split into Southend West and Southend East.
Southampton	1295	
South Molton	1885	
Southwark Central	1918	
Southwark North	1918	
Southwark South East	1918	
Spennymoor	1918	
Spen Valley	1885	
Stockport	1832	Second creation from 1983
Stoke	1918	
Stourbridge	1918	Second creation in 1997
Sunderland	1832	
Thornbury	1885	Merged into Stroud and Thornbury
Tottenham North	1918	
Tottenham South	1918	
University of Wales	1918	
Upton	1918	
Wansbeck	1885	Second creation from 1983
Waterloo	1918	
Wentworth	1918	Second creation from 1983
Westminster Abbey	1918	Merged into Cities of London and Westminster
Westminster, St George's	1918	Merged into Cities of London and Westminster
Whitechapel and St George's	1918	
Wolverhampton East	1885	
Wolverhampton West	1885	

== Constituencies abolished in 1945 ==
The House of Commons (Redistribution of Seats) Act 1944 established four Boundary Commissions. Their first task was to review the largest constituencies in the country and recommend division as appropriate. Many of these constituencies were in the population growth areas around London.

	Created	Notes
Blackpool	1885	Split into Blackpool North and Blackpool South
Coventry	1470	First represented 1298; Split into Coventry East and Coventry West
Ealing	1885	Split into Ealing East and Ealing West
Harrow	1885	Split into Harrow East and Harrow West
Hendon	1918	Split into Hendon North and Hendon South. Reunited 1997
Ilford	1918	Split into Ilford North and Ilford South
Tamworth	1563	Revived 1997; Merged into Lichfield and Tamworth

== Constituencies abolished in 1922 ==
The Government of Ireland Act 1920 provided for a reduced representation from the whole of Ireland. As a result of the Anglo-Irish Treaty and subsequent legislation, Southern Ireland became the Irish Free State and ceased to have representation in the House of Commons and only the reorganisation of constituencies in Northern Ireland took effect.

	Created	Notes
Antrim East	1885	Merged to form Antrim
Antrim Mid	1885	Merged to form Antrim
Antrim North	1885	Merged to form Antrim
Antrim South	1885	Merged to form Antrim
Armagh Mid	1885	Merged to form Armagh
Armagh North	1885	Merged to form Armagh
Armagh South	1885	Merged to form Armagh
Belfast Cromac	1918	Redistributed between: Belfast North; Belfast East; Belfast South and Belfast West
Belfast Duncairn	1918	Redistributed between: Belfast North; Belfast East; Belfast South and Belfast West
Belfast Falls	1918	Redistributed between: Belfast North; Belfast East; Belfast South and Belfast West
Belfast Ormeau	1918	Redistributed between: Belfast North; Belfast East; Belfast South and Belfast West
Belfast Pottinger	1918	Redistributed between: Belfast North; Belfast East; Belfast South and Belfast West
Belfast St Anne's	1918	Redistributed between: Belfast North; Belfast East; Belfast South and Belfast West
Belfast Shankill	1918	Redistributed between: Belfast North; Belfast East; Belfast South and Belfast West
Belfast Victoria	1918	Redistributed between: Belfast North; Belfast East; Belfast South and Belfast West
Belfast Woodvale	1918	Redistributed between: Belfast North; Belfast East; Belfast South and Belfast West
Cavan East	1885	Left Union
Cavan West	1885	Left Union
Clare East	1885	Left Union
Clare West	1885	Left Union
Connemara	1885	Left Union
Cork City	1801	Left Union
County Carlow	1801	Left Union
County Cork East	1885	Left Union
County Cork Mid	1885	Left Union
County Cork North	1885	Left Union
County Cork North East	1885	Left Union
County Cork South	1885	Left Union
County Cork South East	1885	Left Union
County Cork West	1885	Left Union
Dublin North	1885	Left Union
Dublin South	1885	Left Union
County Galway East	1885	Left Union
County Galway North	1885	Left Union
County Galway South	1885	Left Union
County Kilkenny North	1885	Left Union
County Kilkenny South	1885	Left Union
County Limerick East	1885	Left Union
County Limerick West	1885	Left Union
County Londonderry North	1885	Merged with Londonderry City to form Londondery
County Londonderry South	1885	Merged with Londonderry City to form Londondery
County Sligo North	1885	Left Union
County Sligo South	1885	left Union
County Waterford	1918	Second creation – previously 1801–85. Left Union
County Wexford North	1885	Left Union
County Wexford South	1885	Left Union
County Louth	1918	Left Union
Donegal East	1885	Left Union
Donegal North	1885	Left Union
Donegal South	1885	Left Union
Donegal West	1885	Left Union
Down East	1885	Merged to form Down
Down Mid	1918	Merged to form Down.
Down North	1885	Merged to form Down
Down South	1885	Merged to form Down
Down West	1885	Merged to form Down
Dublin Clontarf	1918	Left Union
Dublin College Green	1885	Left Union
Dublin Harbour	1885	Left Union
Dublin St James's	1918	Left Union
Dublin St Michan's	1918	Left Union
Dublin St Patrick's	1885	Left Union
Dublin St Stephen's Green	1885	Left Union
Dublin University	1801	Left Union
Fermanagh North	1885	Merged with Tyrone North-East, Tyrone North-West and Tyrone South to form Fermanagh and Tyrone
Fermanagh South	1885	Merged with Tyrone North-East, Tyrone North-West and Tyrone South to form Fermanagh and Tyrone
Kerry East	1885	Left Union
Kerry North	1885	Left Union
Kerry South	1885	Left Union
Kerry West	1885	Left Union
Kildare North	1885	Left Union
Kildare South	1885	Left Union
King's County	1918	Second creation – previously 1801–85. Left Union
Leitrim	1918	Second creation – previously 1801–85. Left Union
Limerick City	1801	Left Union
Londonderry City	1801	Merged with County Londonderry North and County Londonderry South to form Londondery
Longford	1918	Second creation – previously 1801–85. Left Union
Mayo East	1885	Left Union
Mayo North	1885	Left Union
Mayo South	1885	Left Union
Mayo West	1885	Left Union
Meath North	1885	Left Union
Meath South	1885	Left Union
Monaghan North	1885	Left Union
Monaghan South	1885	Left Union
National University of Ireland	1918	Left Union
Pembroke (Co Dublin)	1918	Left Union
Queen's County	1918	Second creation – previously 1801–85. Left Union
Rathmines	1918	Left Union
Roscommon North	1885	Left Union
Roscommon South	1885	Left Union
Tipperary East	1885	Left Union
Tipperary Mid	1885	Left Union
Tipperary South	1885	Left Union
Tyrone North-East	1918	Merged with Fermanagh North and Fermanagh South to form Fermanagh and Tyrone
Tyrone North-West	1918	Merged with Fermanagh North and Fermanagh South to form Fermanagh and Tyrone
Tyrone South	1885	Merged with Fermanagh North and Fermanagh South to form Fermanagh and Tyrone
Waterford City	1801	Left Union
Westmeath	1918	Second creation – previously 1801–85. Left Union
Wicklow East	1885	Left Union
Wicklow West	1885	Left Union

== Constituencies abolished in 1918 ==
The Representation of the People Act 1918, in addition to finally enfranchising women, provided for a redistribution of seats with the aim of equalising electorates, particularly where these had changed significantly since 1885. Many smaller seats were abolished while some larger ones were divided.

	Created	Notes
Aberdeenshire Eastern	1868	Divided between Aberdeen and Kincardine East and Aberdeen and Kincardine Central (both abolished 1950)
Aberdeenshire Western	1868	Divided between Aberdeen and Kincardine Central, Aberdeen and Kincardine East and Kincardine and Aberdeenshire West (all abolished 1950)
Andover	1586	First represented in 1295
Appleby	1295	Merged into Westmorland
Arfon	1885	Revived in 2010
Ashburton	1885	Second creation. Previously 1640–1868.
Aston Manor	1885	
Ayrshire North	1868	Divided between Bute and Northern Ayrshire and Kilmarnock
Battersea	1885	Divided between Battersea North and Battersea South; A new Battersea was created 1983
Belfast East	1885	Reestablished 1922
Belfast North	1885	Reestablished 1922
Belfast South	1885	Reestablished 1922
Belfast West	1885	Reestablished 1922
Bermondsey	1885	Split into Rotherhithe and Bermondsey West; Later reunited.
Biggleswade	1885	
Birkenhead	1861	Split into Birkenhead East and Birkenhead West; Reunited 1950
Birmingham Bordesley	1885	
Birmingham Central	1885	
Birmingham East	1885	
Birmingham Moseley	1885	
Birmingham North	1885	
Birmingham South	1885	
Birr	1885	Merged to form King's County
Blackfriars and Hutchesontown	1885	
Boston	1547	
Bradford West	1885	Revived 1955
Buteshire	1708	Merged into Bute and Northern Ayrshire
Caithness	1708	Merged with Sutherland and parts of Wick District of Burghs to form Caithness and Sutherland (abolished 1997)
Cardiff	1542	Split into Cardiff Central, Cardiff East and Cardiff South
Chesterton	1885	
Christchurch	1571	
Clackmannan and Kinross	1832	Divided between Clackmannan and East Stirlingshire, Kinross and West Perthshire and Perth
Cockermouth	1640	First represented 1295. Divided between Workington and Penrith and Cockermouth
County Louth North	1885	
County Louth South	1885	
County Waterford East	1885	
County Waterford West	1885	
Cricklade	1295	
Croydon	1885	Split into Croydon North and Croydon South
Droitwich	1554	First represented 1295
Dumfries District of Burghs	1708	Components merged into Dumfriesshire and Galloway
East Carmarthenshire	1885	
East Denbighshire	1885	
East Glamorganshire	1885	
East Northamptonshire	1885	
East Somerset	1832	
East Worcestershire	1832	
Edinburgh and St Andrews Universities	1868	
Egremont	1885	Merged into Whitehaven
Eifion	1885	
Elgin Burghs	1708	
Elginshire and Nairnshire	1832	
Erith and Crayford	1955	
Eskdale	1885	Divided between North Cumberland and Workington
Falkirk District of Burghs	1708	Divided between Stirling and Falkirk District of Burghs, Hamilton, Lanark and Linlithgowshire
Finsbury Central	1885	
Finsbury East	1885	
Flint	1542	
Fulham (1885 to 1918)	1885	Divided into Fulham East and Fulham West (both abolished 1955); A new Fulham was created in 1955
Galway Borough	1801	
Glasgow and Aberdeen Universities	1868	
Glasgow College	1885	
Haddingtonshire	1708	
Haggerston	1885	
Hallamshire	1885	
Hammersmith	1885	Second creation 1983–97
Hawick	1868	
Holmfirth	1885	
Hoxton	1885	
Huntingdon	1295	
Hyde	1885	Merged with Stalybridge to form Stalybridge and Hyde
Inverness-shire	1708	
Kendal	1832	Merged into Westmorland
Kilkenny City	1801	
Kilmarnock District of Burghs	1832	Components merged into Dumbarton District of Burghs, Kilmarnock, Renfrewshire East, Renfrewshire West and Rutherglen
Kincardineshire	1708	Merged into Kincardine and Western Aberdeenshire (abolished 1950)
Kingston upon Hull West	1885	Strictly Kingston upon Hull West. Second creation 1955–97.
Kirkcudbright	1708	
Launceston	1295	
Leeds East	1885	Second creation from 1955.
Leicester	1295	
Leith District of Burghs	1832	Divided into Edinburgh Leith and Edinburgh East
Queen's County Leix	1885	Merged to form Queen's County
Lewisham	1885	
Liverpool Abercromby	1885	
Longford North	1885	
Longford South	1885	
Manchester East	1885	
Manchester North	1885	
Manchester North East	1885	
Manchester North West	1885	
Manchester South	1885	
Manchester South West	1885	
Marlborough	1295	Per the constituency article, abolished 1885
Marylebone East	1885	
Marylebone West	1885	
Medway	1885	Second creation from 1983
Merthyr Tydfil	1832	Second creation 1950–83
Mid County Durham	1885	
Middlesbrough	1868	Second creation from 1974
Midlothian (1708 to 1918)	1708	Known also as Edinburghshire; A new Midlothian was created in 1955
Mid Derbyshire	1885	
Mid Glamorganshire	1885	
Mid Lanarkshire	1885	
Mid Norfolk	1885	Second creation from 1983
Mid Northamptonshire	1885	
Monmouthshire North	1885	
Monmouthshire South	1885	
Monmouthshire West	1885	
Montgomery	1542	
Morley	1885	
Newcastle-upon-Tyne	1295	
Newington West	1885	
Newmarket	1885	
Newport (Shropshire)	1885	
Newry	1801	
North East Lanarkshire	1885	
North Leitrim	1885	
North Lonsdale	1885	Divided between Lonsdale and Westmorland
North Northamptonshire	1832	
North Somerset	1885	
North West Durham	1885	A new North West Durham was created in 1950
North West Lanarkshire	1885	
North Westmeath	1885	
North West Norfolk	1885	Second creation from 1974
North West Staffordshire	1885	
North Worcestershire	1885	
Osgoldcross	1885	
Ossory	1885	Merged to form Queen's County
Partick	1885	Largely replaced by Glasgow Partick
Pembroke and Haverfordwest	1885	
Perthshire East	1885	Merged into Perth (renamed Perth and East Perthshire 1950)
Perthshire West	1885	Divided between Perth and Kinross and Western Perthshire
Plymouth	1442	First represented 1298. Split into Drake and Sutton
Poplar	1885	Second creation 1950–74
Portsmouth	1295	
Prestwich	1885	
Radcliffe-cum-Farnworth	1885	
Radnorshire	1542	
Ramsey	1885	
Rhondda	1885	Second creation from 1974
Rochester	1295	
Ross (Herefordshire)	1885	
St Andrews	1832	
St Augustine's	1885	
St Austell	1885	
St George's (Tower Hamlets)	1885	
St Pancras East	1885	
St Pancras South	1885	
St Pancras West	1885	
Sleaford	1885	
South East County Durham	1885	
South Glamorganshire	1885	
South Lanarkshire	1868	
South Leitrim	1885	
South Northamptonshire	1832	Second creation 1950–74
South Somerset	1885	
Southwark West	1885	
South Westmeath	1885	
Stalybridge	1868	Merged with Hyde to form Stalybridge and Hyde
Stamford	1467	First represented 1295
Stepney	1885	Second creation 1950–74
Stirlingshire	1708	Divided between Stirlingshire West and Clackmannan and East Stirlingshire
Stoke-upon-Trent	1832	
Stowmarket	1885	
Strand	1885	Merged into Westminster Abbey
Stratford-on-Avon	1885	Second creation from 1974
Sutherland	1708	Merged with Caithness and parts of Wick District of Burghs to form Caithness and Sutherland (abolished 1997)
Swansea District	1885	
Swansea Town	1885	
Tewkesbury	1610	
Tottenham	1885	Second creation from 1950
Truro	1295	Second creation 1950–97
Tullamore	1885	Merged to form King's County
Tyneside	1885	
Tyrone East	1885	
Tyrone Mid	1885	
Tyrone North	1885	
Walthamstow	1885	Second creation from 1974
Walworth	1885	
Wandsworth	1885	Divided into Putney, Wandsworth Central, Balham and Tooting and Streatham
Wellington (Shropshire)	1885	
Wellington (Somerset)	1885	
West Carmarthenshire	1885	
West Denbighshire	1885	
West Ham North	1885	Second creation 1950–74
West Ham South	1885	Second creation 1950–74
Westminster	1545	Merged into Westminster Abbey
West Staffordshire	1868	
Whitby	1832	
Wick District of Burghs	1708	Known also as Northern Burghs; Components merged into Caithness and Sutherland, Orkney and Shetland and Ross and Cromarty
Wigtownshire	1708	
Wilton	1295	
Wisbech	1885	
Wokingham	1885	Second creation from 1950
Wolverhampton South	1885	
Woodstock	1571	First represented as New Woodstock 1302
Woolwich	1885	Second creation 1983–97,

== Constituencies abolished in 1885 ==
The Redistribution of Seats Act 1885 disenfranchised boroughs with populations of less than 15,000, while several large towns and counties were subdivided into single member constituencies.

	Created	Notes
Aberdeen	1832	Split into Aberdeen North and Aberdeen South
Antrim	1801	Split into East Antrim, Mid Antrim, North Antrim and South Antrim. Second creation 1922–50.
City of Armagh	1801	Merged into County Armagh
County Armagh	1801	Split into Mid Armagh, North Armagh and South Armagh. Second creation 1922–83.
Athlone	1801	Merged into Westmeath
Bandon	1801	Merged into County Cork
Beaumaris	1553	Merged into Anglesey
Bedfordshire	1290	Split into Biggleswade and Luton
Belfast	1801	Split into Belfast East, Belfast North, Belfast South and Belfast West
Berkshire	1290	Split into Abingdon, Newbury, Windsor and Wokingham
Birmingham	1832	Split into Birmingham Bordesley, Birmingham Central, Birmingham East, Birmingham Edgbaston, Birmingham North, Birmingham South and Birmingham West
Bradford (Yorkshire)	1832	Split into Bradford Central, Bradford East and Bradford West
Brecon	1542	Merged into Breconshire
Bridgnorth	1295	
Bridport	1295	
Bristol	1295	Split into Bristol East, Bristol North, Bristol South and Bristol West
Buckinghamshire	1290	Split into Aylesbury, Buckingham and Wycombe
Caernarvonshire	1542	Split into Arfon and Eifion. Second creation 1918–50.
Calne	1295	
Cambridgeshire	1290	Split into Chesterton, Newmarket and Wisbech. Second creation 1918–83.
Cardigan	1542	Merged into Cardiganshire. Second creation 1974–83
Carlow	1885	Merged into County Carlow
Carmarthenshire	1542	Split into Carmarthenshire East and Carmarthenshire West
Carrickfergus	1801	
County Cavan	1801	Split into East Cavan and West Cavan
East Cheshire	1868	
Mid Cheshire	1868	
West Cheshire	1868	
Clare	1801	Split into East Clare and West Clare
Clonmel	1801	
Coleraine	1801	
County Cork	1801	
East Cornwall	1832	
West Cornwall	1832	
East Cumberland	1832	
West Cumberland	1832	
Denbighshire	1542	
East Derbyshire	1868	
North Derbyshire	1832	
East Devon	1868	Second creation from 1997
North Devon	1832	Second creation from 1950
South Devon	1832	
Donegal	1801	
Dorchester	1295	
Dorset	1290	
Down	1801	Second creation 1922–50.
Downpatrick	1801	
Drogheda	1801	
City of Dublin	1801	
County Dublin	1801	
Dundalk	1801	
Dungannon	1801	
Dungarvan	1801	
North Durham	1832	Second creation from 1983
South Durham	1832	
East Retford	1571	First creation 1316-by 1327
East Riding of Yorkshire	1832	
Edinburgh	1708	Split into Edinburgh Central, Edinburgh East, Edinburgh South and Edinburgh West
Ennis	1801	
Enniskillen	1801	
East Essex	1868	
South Essex	1832	
West Essex	1868	
Fermanagh	1801	
Fife	1708	Split into East Fife and West Fife
Finsbury	1832	Second creation 1918–50
County Galway	1801	
Glamorganshire	1542	
Glasgow	1832	Divided into Glasgow Blackfriars and Hutchesontown, Glasgow Bridgeton, Glasgow Camlachie, Glasgow College, Glasgow Central, Glasgow St Rollox and Glasgow Tradeston
East Gloucestershire	1832	
West Gloucestershire	1832	Second creation 1950–97
Great Marlow	1625	First creation 1301-by 1307
Hackney	1868	
Haddington	1708	
North Hampshire	1832	
South Hampshire	1832	
Haverfordwest	1545	Merged into Pembroke and Haverfordwest
Helston	1298	
Herefordshire	1290	
Hertfordshire	1290	
Huntingdonshire	1290	Second creation 1918–83
East Kent	1832	
Mid Kent	1868	Second creation 1983–97
West Kent	1832	
Kerry	1801	
Kildare	1801	
County Kilkenny	1801	
King's County	1801	Second creation 1918–22
Kingston upon Hull	1334	First creation 1305-by 1327
Kinsale	1801	
Knaresborough	1553	
Lambeth	1832	
North Lanarkshire	1868	Split into Lanarkshire North-East, Lanarkshire North-West, Lanarkshire Mid, Govan and Partick. Second creation 1918–83.
North Lancashire	1832	
North East Lancashire	1868	
South East Lancashire	1868	
South West Lancashire	1868	
Leeds	1832	
North Leicestershire	1832	
South Leicestershire	1832	
Leitrim	1801	Second creation 1918–22
Limerick (County)	1801	
Mid Lincolnshire	1868	
North Lincolnshire	1868	
South Lincolnshire	1868	
Lisburn	1801	
Liskeard	1295	
Liverpool	1545	First creation 1295-by 1442
Londonderry (County)	1801	Second creation 1922–83
Longford	1801	Second creation 1918–22
Louth (County)	1801	Second creation 1918–22
Lymington	1584	
Mallow	1801	
Malmesbury	1295	
Malton	1641	First creation 1295
Manchester	1832	
Marlborough	1295	
Marylebone	1832	
Mayo	1801	
Meath	1801	
Middlesex	1290	Split into Tottenham, Hornsey, Harrow, Uxbridge, Brentford and Ealing.
Midhurst	1311	
Monaghan	1801	
Monmouthshire	1542	Split into East Monmouthshire, North Monmouthshire and South Monmouthshire.
Much Wenlock	1472	
Newport (Isle of Wight)	1584	Merged into Isle of Wight
New Ross	1801	
New Shoreham	1295	(for the 1974–1997 constituency, see Shoreham)
West Norfolk	1832	
Northallerton	1641	First creation 1298
North Riding of Yorkshire	1832	Split into Richmond, Cleveland, Whitby, and Thirsk and Malton
North Northumberland	1832	
South Northumberland	1832	
Nottingham	1295	Split into 3 divisions
North Nottinghamshire	1832	
South Nottinghamshire	1832	
Oxfordshire	1290	
Pembroke (Pembrokeshire)	1542	Merged into Pembroke and Haverfordwest. Second creation 1974–83.
Perthshire	1708	
Poole	1453	First creation 1362-by 1377
Portarlington	1801	
Queen's County	1801	Second creation 1918–22
Radnor	1542	Also known as New Radnor. Merged into Radnorshire.
Renfrewshire	1708	Split into 2 divisions
Roscommon	1801	Split into 2 divisions
Salford	1832	Second creation from 1997
Sandwich	1366	
Shaftesbury	1295	
Sheffield	1832	
North Shropshire	1832	Second creation from 1983
South Shropshire	1832	
County Sligo	1801	
Mid Somerset	1868	
West Somerset	1832	
Southwark	1295	Second creation 1983–97
East Staffordshire	1868	
North Staffordshire	1832	
East Suffolk	1832	
West Suffolk	1832	Second creation from 1997
East Surrey	1832	Second creation from 1918
Mid Surrey	1868	
West Surrey	1832	
East Sussex	1832	
West Sussex	1832	
Swansea	1832	
Thirsk	1547	First creation 1295
Tipperary	1801	
Tower Hamlets	1832	
Tralee	1801	
Tynemouth and North Shields	1832	
Tyrone	1801	
Wallingford	1295	
Wareham	1302	
Warwick	1295	
North Warwickshire	1832	Second creation from 1983
South Warwickshire	1832	
County Waterford	1801	Second creation 1918–22
Westmeath	1801	Second creation 1918–22
Westmorland	1290	Split into Appleby and Kendal. Second creation 1918–83.
West Riding of Yorkshire East	1865	
West Riding of Yorkshire North	1865	
West Riding of Yorkshire South	1865	
Borough of Wexford	1801	Merged into County Wexford
County Wexford	1801	Split into North Wexford and South Wexford
Weymouth and Melcombe Regis	1572	
Wicklow	1801	
Wigtown	1708	
North Wiltshire	1832	Second creation from 1983
South Wiltshire	1832	
Wolverhampton	1832	Split into 3 divisions
Worcestershire West	1832	Second creation from 1997 as West Worcestershire
Youghal	1801	

== Constituencies abolished in 1870 ==
Constituency	Created	Notes
Beverley	1563	Disenfranchised for corruption. First creation 1295-by 1307. Third creation 1950–55. Fourth creation 1983–97.
Bridgwater	1295	Disenfranchised for corruption. Second creation from 1885.
Cashel	1801	Disenfranchised for corruption
Sligo (Borough)	1801	Disenfranchised for corruption

== Constituencies abolished in 1868 ==
The Reform Act 1867 disenfranchised the remaining boroughs with populations under 10,000 and subdivided some county constituencies.

	Created	Notes
Aberdeenshire	1708	Divided into East Aberdeenshire and West Aberdeenshire
Arundel	1295	Second creation 1974–97
Ashburton	1640	First creation 1298. Third creation 1885–1918.
Ayrshire	1708	Divided into North Ayrshire (abolished 1918) and South Ayrshire (abolished 1983)
North Cheshire	1832	With South Cheshire, redistributed to form East Cheshire, Mid Cheshire and West Cheshire
South Cheshire	1832	With North Cheshire, redistributed to form East Cheshire, Mid Cheshire and West Cheshire
Dartmouth	1351	First creation 1298
North Essex	1832	Split into East Essex and West Essex. Second creation from 1997.
Great Yarmouth	1298	Also known as Yarmouth (Norfolk). Second creation from 1885.
Honiton	1640	First creation 1301-by 1307. Third creation from 1885.
South Lancashire	1832	
Lancaster	1523	First creation 1295-by 1376. Third creation 1885–1997.
Lanarkshire	1708	Divided into North Lanarkshire and South Lanarkshire
Lyme Regis	1295	
East Norfolk	1832	
Peeblesshire	1708	United with Selkirkshire to form Peebles and Selkirk
Reigate	1295	Second creation from 1885.
Selkirkshire	1708	United with Peeblesshire to form Peebles and Selkirk
South Staffordshire	1832	Split into East Staffordshire and West Staffordshire. Reestablished 1983
Thetford	1529	
Totnes	1295	Second creation 1885–1983. Third creation from 1997.
Wells	1295	Second creation from 1885.

== Constituencies abolished between 1832 and 1867 ==
St Albans and Sudbury were both disenfranchised for corruption. After some delay, their seats were redistributed by a special act of Parliament, the Birkenhead Enfranchisement Act 1861. One were given to create a new parliamentary borough for Birkenhead, one was added to the Southern Division of Lancashire, and the remaining two were given to the West Riding of Yorkshire, which was thereafter divided into two constituencies.

Year		Created	Notes
1865	West Riding of Yorkshire	1832	Split into two divisions, Northern and Southern, by the Birkenhead Enfranchisement Act 1861.
1852	St Albans	1553	Disenfranchised for corruption by Disfranchisement of St. Alban's Act 1852. First created 1311-by 1326. Third creation from 1885.
1844	Sudbury	1559	Disenfranchised for corruption by Disfranchisement of Sudbury Act 1844. Second creation 1885–1950.

== Constituencies abolished by the Reform Act 1832 ==
The Reform Act 1832 saw the abolition of a wide range of rotten boroughs in England. There were also a few changes to Scottish constituencies.

	Created	Notes
Aberdeen Burghs	1708	Components split into Aberdeen and part of Montrose Burghs
Aldborough	1558	
Aldeburgh	1571	
Amersham	1625	First creation 1300-by 1307
Anstruther Easter Burghs	1708	Components became part of St Andrews Burghs
Appleby	1295	
Bere Alston	1584	
Bishop's Castle	1584	
Bletchingley	1295	
Boroughbridge	1553	
Bossiney	1547	
Brackley	1547	
Bramber	1467	First creation 1295-by 1441
Callington	1584	
Camelford	1547	
Castle Rising	1558	
Cheshire	1545	two divisions
Clackmannanshire	1708	Merged with Kinross-shire to form Clackmannanshire and Kinross-shire (abolished 1918)
Corfe Castle	1572	
Cornwall	1290	two divisions
Cromartyshire	1708	Merged with Ross-shire to form Ross and Cromarty (abolished 1983)
Cumberland	1290	two divisions
Derbyshire	1290	two divisions
Devon	1290	two divisions
Downton	1467	First creation 1295-by 1441
Dunwich	1298	
County Durham	1675	two divisions
Dysart Burghs	1708	Components became part of Kirkcaldy Burghs
East Grinstead	1307	
East Looe	1571	
Elginshire	1708	Merged with Nairnshire to form Elginshire and Nairnshire (abolished 1918)
Essex	1290	two divisions
Fowey	1571	
Gatton	1450	
Glasgow Burghs	1708	Also known as Clyde Burghs. Components split into Glasgow and part of Kilmarnock Burghs
Gloucestershire	1290	two divisions
Great Bedwyn	1295	
Hampshire	1290	two divisions
Haslemere	1584	
Hedon	1547	First creation 1295
Heytesbury	1449	
Higham Ferrers	1558	
Hindon	1449	
Ilchester	1621	First creation 1298
Kent	1290	two divisions
Kinross-shire	1708	Merged with Clackmannanshire to form Clackmannanshire and Kinross-shire (abolished 1918)
Lanark Burghs	1708	Strictly Linlithgow Burghs
Lancashire	1290	two divisions
Leicestershire	1290	two divisions
Lincolnshire	1290	two divisions
Lostwithiel	1305	
Ludgershall	1295	
Milborne Port	1628	First creation 1298-by 1307
Minehead	1563	
Mitchell	1547	Also known as St Michael's
Nairnshire	1708	Merged with Elginshire to form Elginshire and Nairnshire (abolished 1918)
New Romney	1371	
Newport (Cornwall)	1529	
Newton (Lancashire)	1559	
Newtown (Isle of Wight)	1584	
Norfolk	1290	two divisions
Northamptonshire	1290	two divisions
Northumberland	1290	two divisions
Nottinghamshire	1290	two divisions
Okehampton	1640	First creation 1301-by 1307
Old Sarum	1360	First creation 1295
Orford	1512	First creation 1298-by 1307
Plympton Erle	1295	
Queenborough	1571	
Ross-shire	1708	Merged with Cromartyshire to form Ross and Cromarty (abolished 1983)
St Germans	1563	
St Mawes	1563	
Saltash	1547	
Seaford	1641	First creation 1298-by 1307
Shropshire	1290	two divisions
Somerset	1290	two divisions
Staffordshire	1290	two divisions
Steyning	1467	First creation 1298-by 1307. Second creation by 1327–1442.
Stockbridge	1563	
Suffolk	1290	two divisions
Surrey	1290	two divisions
Sussex	1290	two divisions
Tain Burghs	1708	Enlarged and renamed Wick Burghs, also known as Northern Burghs (abolished 1918)
Tregony	1559	First creation 1295
Warwickshire	1290	two divisions
Wendover	1625	First creation 1301-by 1307
Weobley	1628	First creation 1295
West Looe	1547	
Whitchurch	1584	
Wiltshire	1290	two divisions
Winchelsea	1366	
Wootton Bassett	1447	
Worcestershire	1290	two divisions
Yarmouth (Isle of Wight)	1584	
Yorkshire	1290	three divisions

== Constituencies abolished 1529–1821 ==
The disenfranchisement of boroughs was almost unknown in the unreformed House of Commons. Apart from a few special cases in the 16th century and the temporary redistribution of constituencies for the First and Second Protectorate Parliaments in the 1650s, no borough was disenfranchised until Grampound. The Cornish borough was abolished in 1821 in an effort to avoid the more sweeping reforms that later came with the Reform Act 1832.

Constituency	Created	Notes
Grampound	1547	Disenfranchised for corruption 1821 by the Disfranchisement of Grampound (No. 2) Act 1821. Its two seats were transferred and added to Yorkshire from 1826.
Melcombe Regis	1319	Merged with Weymouth to form Weymouth and Melcombe Regis in 1572 by the Union of Weymouth and Melcombe Regis Act 1571
Weymouth	1348	Merged with Melcombe Regis to form Weymouth and Melcombe Regis in 1572
Calais	1536	Borough in France, re-conquered by the French in 1558
Newborough	1542	Borough constituency in Anglesey, altered to Beaumaris from 1553
Tournai	1513	Borough in France (now Belgium), returned to French rule in 1519

== Constituency abolished 1472 ==
A number of boroughs were represented in the parliaments before 1467, but were not enfranchised in that year.

Constituency	Created	Notes
Grantham	1467	Second creation 1484–1997

== Constituencies abolished 1467 ==
A number of boroughs were represented in the parliaments before 1467 but were not enfranchised in that year.

Constituency	Created	Notes
Derby	1295	Second creation 1472–1950
Great Grimsby	1295	Sometimes known as Grimsby. Second creation from 1472.
Southampton	1295	Second creation 1472–1950
Winchester	1295	Second creation from 1472

== Constituencies abolished between 1378 and 1441 ==
A number of boroughs were represented in the parliaments before 1378, but were not enfranchised by 1442. They were seldom, if at all, represented afterwards, until restored to the list of those regularly in receipt of writs of summons in later years.

Constituency	Created	Notes
Bramber	1295	Second creation 1467–1832
Downton	1295	Second creation 1467–1832
Liverpool	1295	Second creation 1545–1885
Steyning	By 1327	First creation 1298-by 1307. Third creation 1467–1832.

== Constituencies abolished between 1328 and 1376 ==
A number of boroughs were represented in the parliaments before 1328 but were not enfranchised by 1377. They were seldom, if at allm represented afterwards, until restored to the list of those regularly in receipt of writs of summons in later years.

Constituency	Created	Notes
Hertford	By 1327	First creation 1298-by 1307. Third creation 1624–1974.
Lancaster	1295	Second creation 1523–1868. Third creation 1885–1997.
New Windsor	1302	Also known as Windsor. Second creation 1447–1974. Third creation from 1997.
Poole	1362	Second creation 1453–1885. Third creation from 1950.
Preston	1295	Second creation 1529–1950. Third creation from 1983.
Ravensrodd	1295	Represented intermittently until 1337.
St Albans	1311	Second creation 1553–1852. Third creation from 1885.

== Constituencies abolished between 1308 and 1327 ==
A number of boroughs were represented in the parliaments before 1308 but were not enfranchised by 1327. They were seldom, if at all, represented afterwards, until restored to the list of those regularly in receipt of writs of summons in later years.

Constituency	Created	Notes
Droitwich	1295	Second creation 1554–1918
Kingston upon Hull	1305	Second creation 1334–1885
Petersfield	1307	Second creation 1547–1983
Wigan	1295	Second creation from 1545

== Constituencies abolished between 1302 and 1307 ==
A number of boroughs were represented in the parliaments before 1302 but were not enfranchised by 1307. They were seldom, if at all, represented afterwards, until restored to the list of those regularly in receipt of writs of summons in later years.

Constituency	Created	Notes
Amersham	1300	Second creation 1625–1832
Beverley	1295	Second creation 1563–1870. Third creation 1950–55. Fourth creation 1983–97.
Evesham	1295	Second creation 1604–1950..
Great Marlow	1301	Second creation 1625–1885
Hertford	1298	Second creation by 1327-by 1377. Third creation 1624–1974.
Honiton	1301	Second creation 1640–1868. Third creation from 1885.
Milborne Port	1298	Second creation 1628–1832
Okehampton	1301	Second creation 1640–1832
Orford	1298	Second creation 1512–1832
Seaford	1298	Second creation 1641–1832
Stamford	1295	Second creation 1467–1918
Steyning	1298	Second creation by 1327–1442. Third creation 1467–1832.
Torrington	1295	Second creation 1950–74
Wendover	1301	Second creation 1625–1832

== Constituencies abolished 1298 ==
A number of boroughs were represented in the parliaments of 1298, but seldom, if at all, represented afterwards, until restored to the list of those regularly in receipt of writs of summons in later centuries.

Constituency	Created	Notes
Ashburton	1298	Second creation 1640–1868. Third creation 1885–1818.
Coventry	1298	Second creation 1470–1945
Dartmouth	1298	Second creation 1351–1868
Ilchester	1298	Second creation 1621–1832
Northallerton	1298	Second creation 1641–1885
Plymouth	1298	Second creation 1442–1918
Pontefract	1298	First creation 1295. Third creation 1621–1918. Fourth creation 1950–74.

== Constituencies abolished 1295 ==
A number of boroughs were represented in the Model Parliament of 1295, but were seldom, if at all, represented afterwards. Some boroughs originally included in the 1295 parliament were restored to the list of those always summoned in later centuries or the same name was used for a constituency after 1832.

Constituency	Created	Notes
Alresford	1295	
Alton	1295	
Andover	1295	Second creation 1586–1918
Axbridge	1295	
Bamborough	1295	
Basingstoke	1295	Second creation from 1885
Bradford (Wiltshire)	1295	
Bromsgrove	1295	Second creation 1950–1974. Third creation from 1983.
Cockermouth	1295	Second creation 1640–1918
Corbridge	1295	
Dudley	1295	Second creation 1832–1974
Egremont	1295	Second creation 1885–1918
Ely	1295	Part of Isle of Ely 1918–1983.
Hedon	1295	Second creation 1547–1832
Kidderminster	1295	Second creation 1832–1983
Ledbury	1295	
Malton	1295	Second creation 1641–1885
Old Sarum	1295	Second creation 1360–1832
Overton	1295	
Pershore	1295	
Pickering	1295	
Pontefract	1295	Second creation 1298. Third creation 1621–1918. Fourth creation 1950–74.
Ripon	1295	Second creation 1553–1983
Tavistock	1295	Second creation 1330–1974
Thirsk	1295	Second creation 1547–1885
Tickhill	1295	
Tregony	1295	Second creation 1559–1832
Tunbridge	1295	Second creation 1885–1918
Weobley	1295	Second creation 1628–1832
Yarmouth and Newport (Isle of Wight)	1295	Split into Yarmouth (Isle of Wight) 1584–1832 & Newport (Isle of Wight) 1584–1885.
Yarum	1295	

== See also ==
- Constituencies of the Parliament of the United Kingdom
- Irish House of Commons
- List of United Kingdom Parliament constituencies in Ireland and Northern Ireland
- List of parliamentary constituencies in Northern Ireland
- Wikipedia:WikiProject UK Parliament constituencies/Historic constituencies
- Wikipedia:WikiProject UK Parliament constituencies/Historic constituency names
