= Sellier =

Sellier is a surname. Notable people with the surname include:

- Charles Sellier (1943–2011), American television producer, writer, and film director
- Félix Sellier (1893–1965), Belgian cyclist
- Jean le Sellier (died 1517), English politician

== See also ==
- Sellier & Bellot, Czech ammunition manufacturing company
