= Wilbraham Tollemache =

Wilbraham Tollemache may refer to:

- Wilbraham Tollemache, 6th Earl of Dysart (1739–1821), British politician
- Wilbraham Tollemache, 2nd Baron Tollemache (1832–1904), British Conservative Member of Parliament
- Wilbraham Spencer Tollemache (1807–1890), English soldier, JP and High Sheriff
