= Sir Philip Grey Egerton, 10th Baronet =

English palaeontologist and Conservative politician

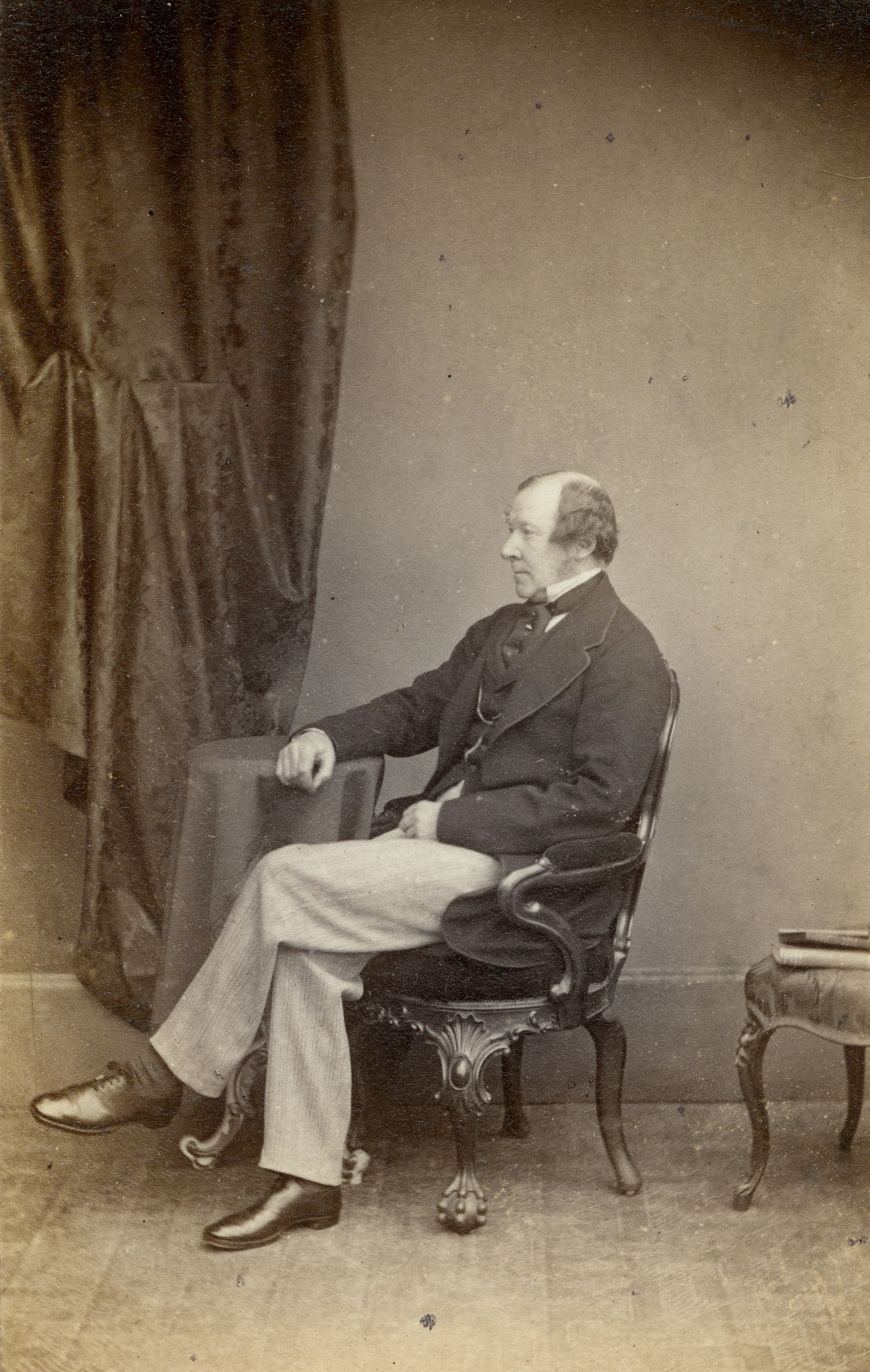
- c. 1865
- Born: November 13, 1806
- Died: April 5, 1881 (aged 74)

Signature
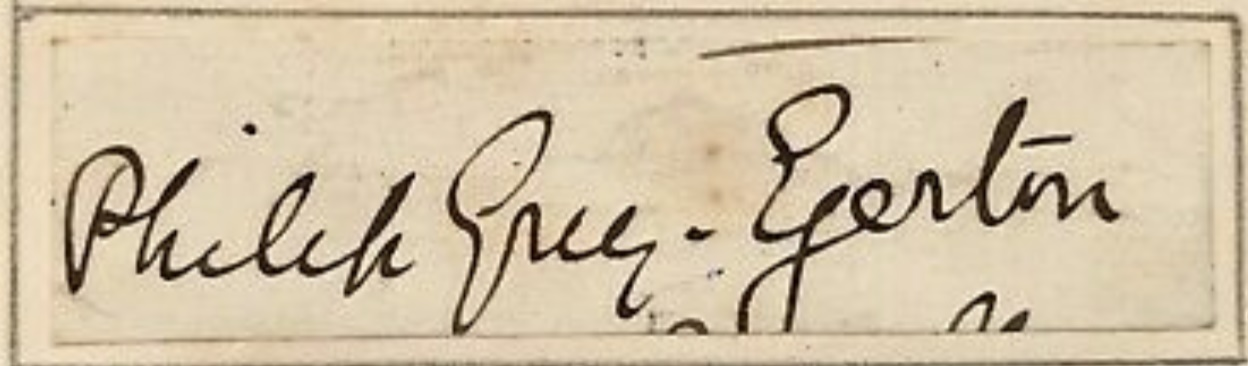

Sir Philip de Malpas Grey Egerton, 10th Baronet FRS (13 November 1806 – 5 April 1881) was an English palaeontologist and Conservative politician from the Egerton family. He sat in the House of Commons variously between 1830 and his death in 1881.

== Early life ==
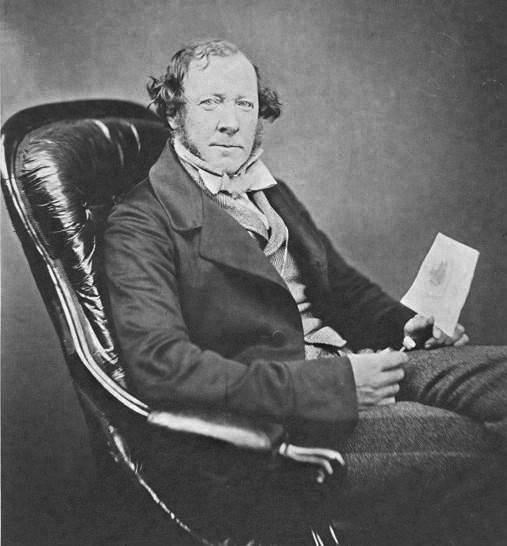
Sir Philip de Malpas Grey-Egerton

Egerton was the son of Sir Philip Grey Egerton, 9th Baronet and his wife Rebecca Du Pre, daughter of Josias Du Pre of Wilton Park, Beaconsfield. He was educated at Eton and Christ Church, Oxford, where he graduated BA in 1828. While at college his interest in geology was aroused by the lectures of William Buckland, and by his acquaintance with William D. Conybeare. He inherited the baronetcy on the death of his father in 1829. He was elected Fellow of the Royal Society in 1831, and was a trustee of the British Museum. When it was first established in 1834 he became a trustee of the Senate of the University of London.

== Geological work ==
While travelling in Switzerland with Lord Cole (later to be 3rd Earl of Enniskillen) they were introduced to Prof. Louis Agassiz at Neufchâtel, and determined to make a special study of fossil fish. During the course of fifty years they gradually gathered together two of the largest and finest of private collections—that of Sir Philip Grey Egerton being at Oulton Park, Tarporley, Cheshire.

Egerton described the structure and affinities of numerous species in the publications of the Geological Society of London, the Geological Magazine and the Decades of the Geological Survey; and in recognition of his services the Wollaston medal was awarded to him in 1873 by the Geological Society. He was elected FRS in 1831, and was a trustee of the British Museum. He was also a member of Grillion's Club, and compiled a history of the club's first fifty years in a book: 'Grillion's Club: From Its Origin in 1812 To Its Fiftieth Anniversary', published in 1880.

He was a member of the founding council of the Ray Society.

== Political life ==
Egerton was a prominent local dignitary, as Deputy Lieutenant of Cheshire and J.P. for the county. He held the post in the militia as Lieutenant Colonel in the Cheshire Yeomanry. He was elected Member of Parliament for the city of Chester in 1830 but lost the seat in 1831. He stood unsuccessfully at Cheshire South in 1832 but was elected in 1835 and held the seat until 1868. He was elected MP for West Cheshire from 1868 until his death in London on 5 April 1881.

== Legacy ==
Egerton's collection of fossil fishes is now in the Natural History Museum, London. He is commemorated in the scientific names of the Rusty-fronted barwing (Actinodura egertoni Gould, 1836), a species of bird in the laughingthrush family found in Southeast Asia; Egertonia Cocchi, 1866, an extinct genus of prehistoric marine and estuarine ray-finned fish ranging in age from the Late Cretaceous to middle Eocene and; the Early Jurassic brittle star fossil, Palaeocoma egertoni (Broderip, 1840), although the latter is now considered a probable junior synonym of the type species, Palaeocoma milleri (Phillips, 1829).

Egerton (1843) transferred Chimaera egertonii Buckland (1835) to his new genus, Ischyodus, an extinct genus of plough-nosed chimaeras (Callorhinchidae). The species is now formally named Ischyodus egertoni (Buckland, 1835) and is specifically associated with the Late Jurassic (Kimmeridgian), although its stratigraphic range may extend upwards into the Early Cretaceous.

Two syntype fossil teeth, described originally as Corax egertoni by Agassiz (1843) and subsequently reassigned by Hay (1902) to the requiem shark genus Carcharhinus Blainville (1816), were regarded by Purdy et al. (2001) to be identical with teeth actually belonging to two extant shark species, namely the Copper shark, Carcharhinus brachyurus (Günther, 1870) and the Bull shark, Carcharhinus leucas (Müller & Henle, F. G. J., 1839).

The Egerton Bascule Bridge and Egerton Dock, located at Birkenhead, Wirral Peninsula, England are also named in honour of Sir Philip de Malpas Grey Egerton.

== Family ==
He married on 8 March 1832, Anna Elizabeth, third daughter of George John Legh and had issue:

- Sir Philip le Belward Grey-Egerton, 11th Baronet (1833–1891), married Henrietta, daughter of Albert Denison, 1st Baron Londesborough
- Anna Mary Elizabeth Grey-Egerton (1834-1927), married Henry Reginald Corbet
- Lt-Col Rowland Grey-Egerton (1838–1923), died unmarried
- Cecily Louisa Grey-Egerton ( -1920), married Dunbar Douglas, 6th Earl of Selkirk

Parliament of the United Kingdom
Preceded by Viscount Belgrave; Lord Robert Grosvenor	Member for Chester; 1830–1831; With: Lord Robert Grosvenor	Succeeded by Lord Robert Grosvenor; Foster Cunliffe-Offley
Preceded by George Wilbraham; Earl Grosvenor	Member for South Cheshire; 1835–1868; With: George Wilbraham 1835–1841; John Tollemache 1841–1868	Constituency abolished
New constituency	Member for West Cheshire; 1868–1881; With: John Tollemache 1868–1872; Hon. Wilbraham Tollemache 1872–1881	Succeeded by Hon. Wilbraham Tollemache; Henry James Tollemache
Baronetage of England
Preceded by Philip Grey-Egerton	Baronet (of Egerton and Oulton); 1829–1881	Succeeded by Philip Grey Egerton
