= Richard Grosvenor, 2nd Marquess of Westminster =

British politician and noble (1795–1869)

The Most Honourable The Marquess of Westminster KG PC
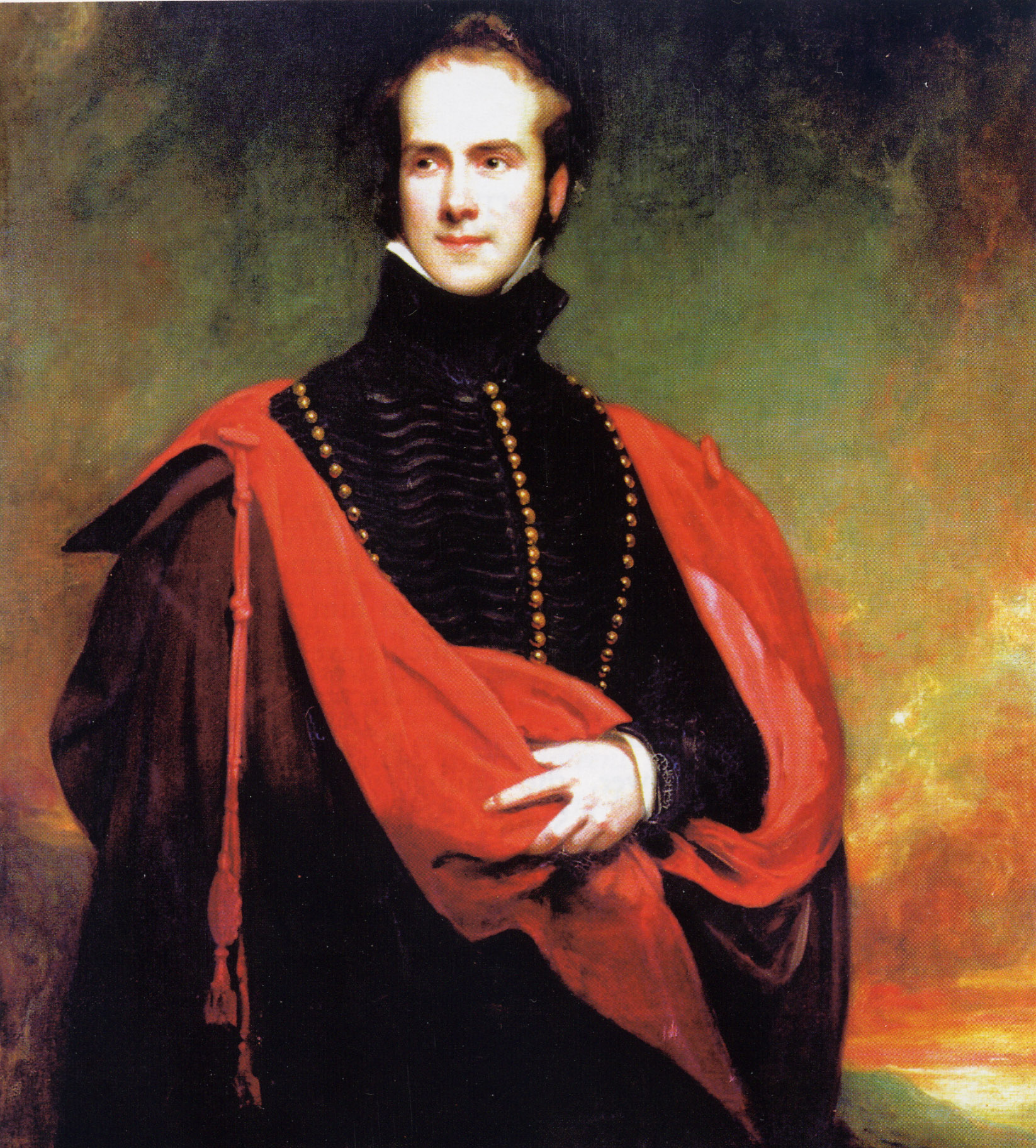

Lord Steward of the Household
- In office 22 March 1850 – 21 February 1852
- Monarch: Victoria
- Prime Minister: Lord John Russell
- Preceded by: The Earl Fortescue
- Succeeded by: The Duke of Montrose

Personal details
- Born: 27 January 1795 Millbank House, Westminster, London
- Died: 31 October 1869 (aged 74) Fonthill House, Fonthill Gifford, Wiltshire, England
- Resting place: St Mary's Church, Eccleston, Cheshire; 53.1576°N 2.8794°W
- Party: Whig
- Spouse: Lady Elizabeth Leveson-Gower (m. 1819)
- Children: Eleanor Percy, Duchess of Northumberland; Mary Parker, Countess of Macclesfield; Gilbert Grosvenor; Elizabeth Lawley, Baroness Wenlock; Hugh Grosvenor, 1st Duke of Westminster; Lady Evelyn Grosvenor; Caroline Leigh, Baroness Leigh; Lady Octavia Shaw-Stewart; Lady Agnes Campbell; Lord Gilbert Grosvenor; Jane Pennington, Baroness Muncaster; Richard Grosvenor, 1st Baron Stalbridge; Lady Theodora Guest
- Parent(s): Robert Grosvenor, 1st Marquess of Westminster; Lady Eleanor Egerton
- Education: Christ Church, Oxford
- Occupation: Landowner, politician

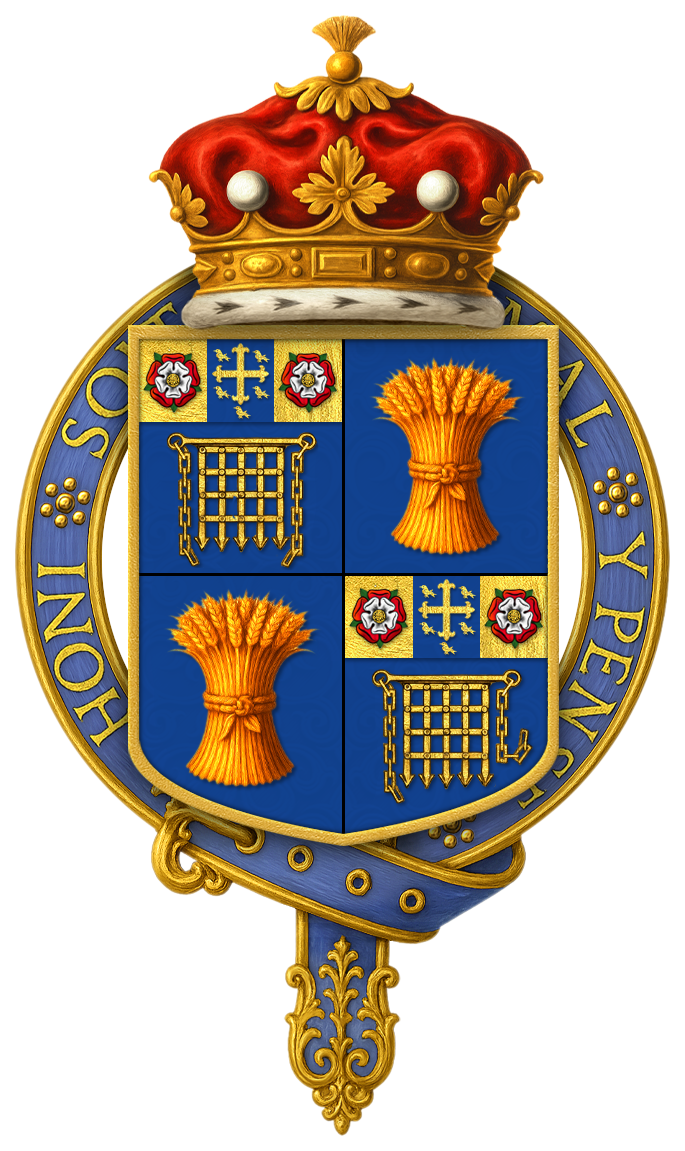
Quartered arms of Richard Grosvenor, 2nd Marquess of Westminster, KG, PC

Richard Grosvenor, 2nd Marquess of Westminster KG PC (27 January 1795 – 31 October 1869), styled The Honourable Richard Grosvenor from 1795 to 1802, Viscount Belgrave from 1802 to 1831 and Earl Grosvenor from 1831 to 1845, was an English politician, landowner, property developer and benefactor.

== Background and education ==
Grosvenor was born at Millbank House, Westminster, London, the eldest of the three sons of Robert Grosvenor, 1st Marquess of Westminster and Lady Eleanor Egerton. He was educated at Westminster School and Christ Church, Oxford where he graduated MA. He undertook the Grand Tour in 1815.

== Political and public life ==
In 1818 Grosvenor was elected as Whig MP for Chester and was later appointed as a Justice of the Peace. In 1830 he was elected MP for Cheshire until the constituency was divided in 1832, and from then until 1834 he represented South Cheshire. He was Lord Lieutenant of Cheshire from 1845 to 1867 and Lord Steward of the Household between 1850 and 1852 in the Whig administration headed by Lord John Russell. On 22 March 1850 he was admitted to the Privy Council. He was presented with the Order of the Garter on 6 July 1857. Of his political activity it is said that "he seldom spoke in the House of Lords".

== Development of the estate ==
Grosvenor "devoted himself ... to the improvement of his London property", and added to his properties in Dorset and Cheshire; he was described as being a "model landlord". Eaton Hall, Cheshire, had been rebuilt in flamboyant Gothic style for his father by William Porden. Grosvenor commissioned the Scottish architect William Burn to make alterations to it, including raising the centre of the south front to make it look like a tower. Burn also designed Fonthill House, Wiltshire, for him in Scottish Baronial style.

On his estates Grosvenor built farms, schools and "numerous" cottages. Among his schools were the Bishopsfield Schools in Hoole, Chester. He also commissioned Shaftesbury Town Hall for the people of the town.

== Personality and personal interests ==
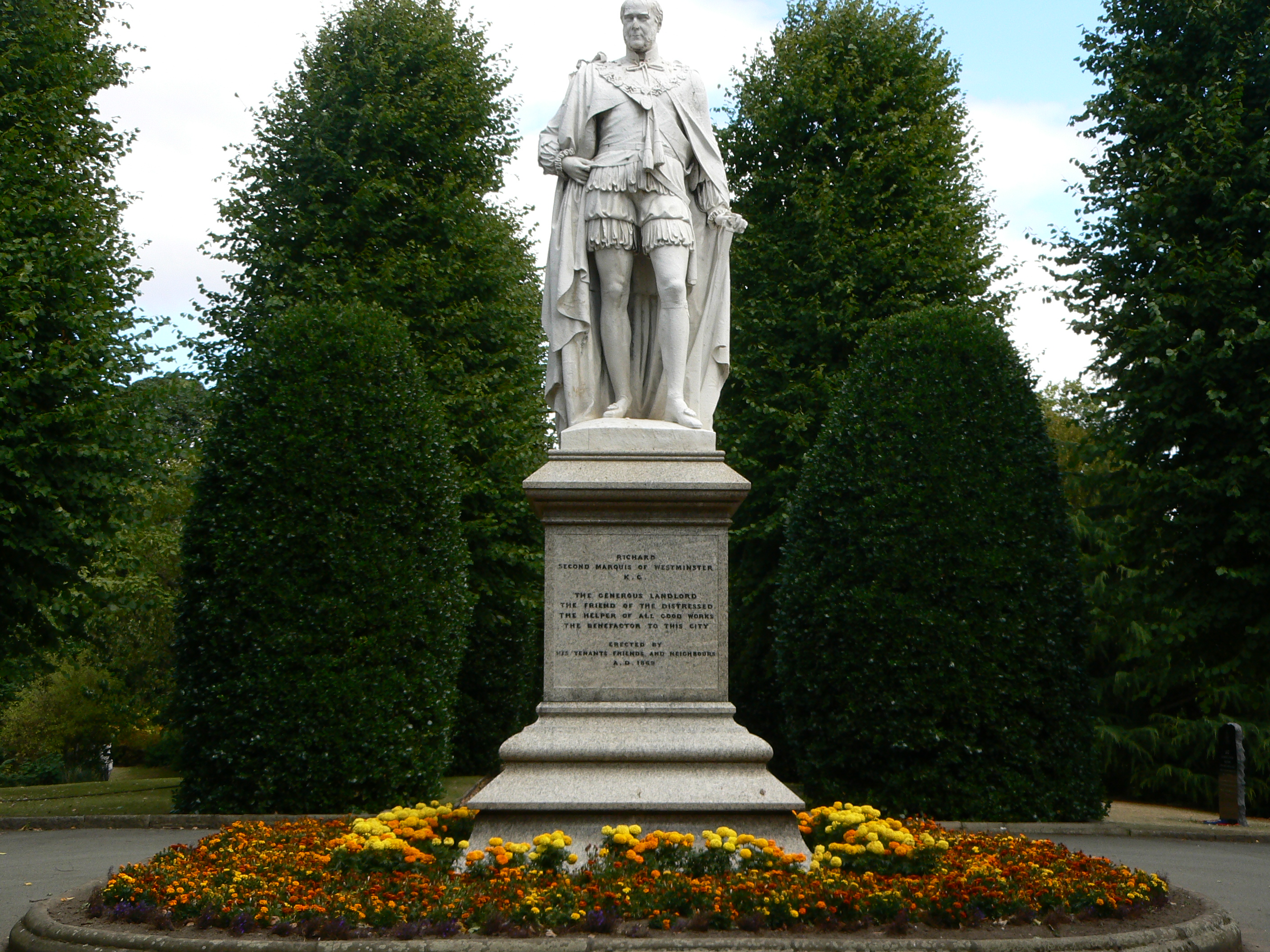
Statue of Grosvenor wearing his Garter robes

Grosvenor continued the family interest in horse racing and, when he was living in the country estate, he spent time hunting and fishing. He gave generously to charity, and built and restored churches. He was an early patron of the Chester architect John Douglas. In 1865–66 Douglas designed St John's Church for him in his estate village of Aldford. About the same time, Grosvenor gave fields in Chester to the city council for the formation of Grosvenor Park. For this park Douglas designed a number of items, including the Entrance Lodge, the gates, and a cover for Billy Hobby's Well. In 1865 the citizens of Chester began to raise money for the erection of a statue "to mark the public and private worth of his lordship, and the high estimation in which he is held by his neighbours and tenants, as well as by all classes of the community". Over £5,000 (equivalent to £540,000 as of 2025) was raised. The statue showing the marquess in his Garter robes was designed by Thomas Thornycroft, and erected in 1869; it still stands in Grosvenor Park.

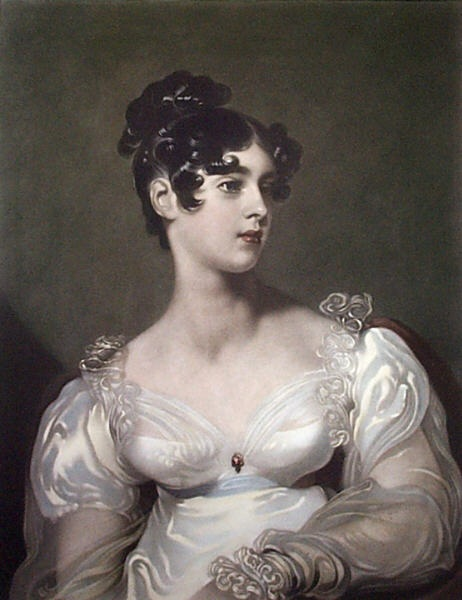
Elizabeth, Marchioness of Westminster, by Sir Thomas Lawrence.

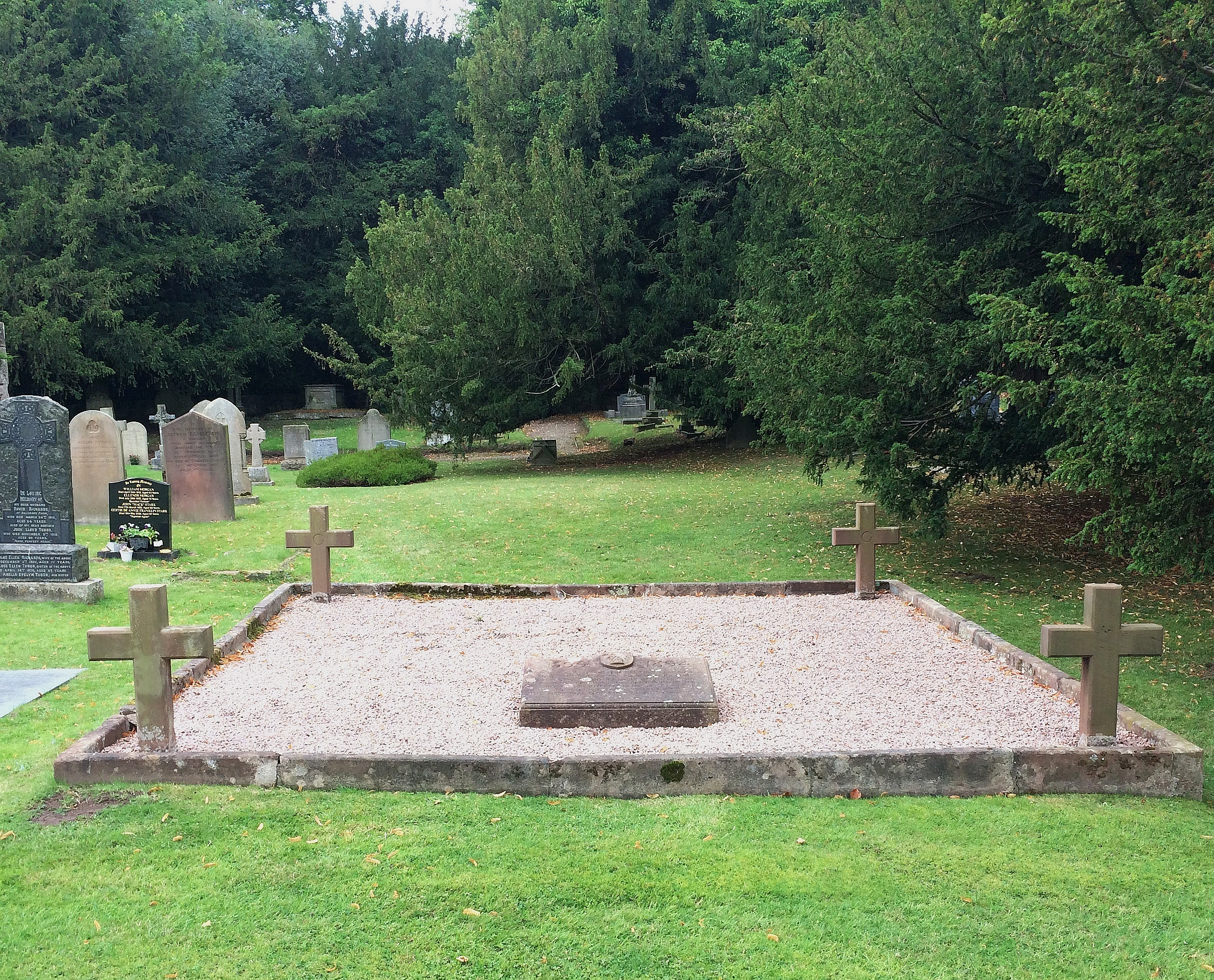
St Mary's Church, Eccleston: the enclosure which marks the site of the Grosvenor family vault within the demolished old church

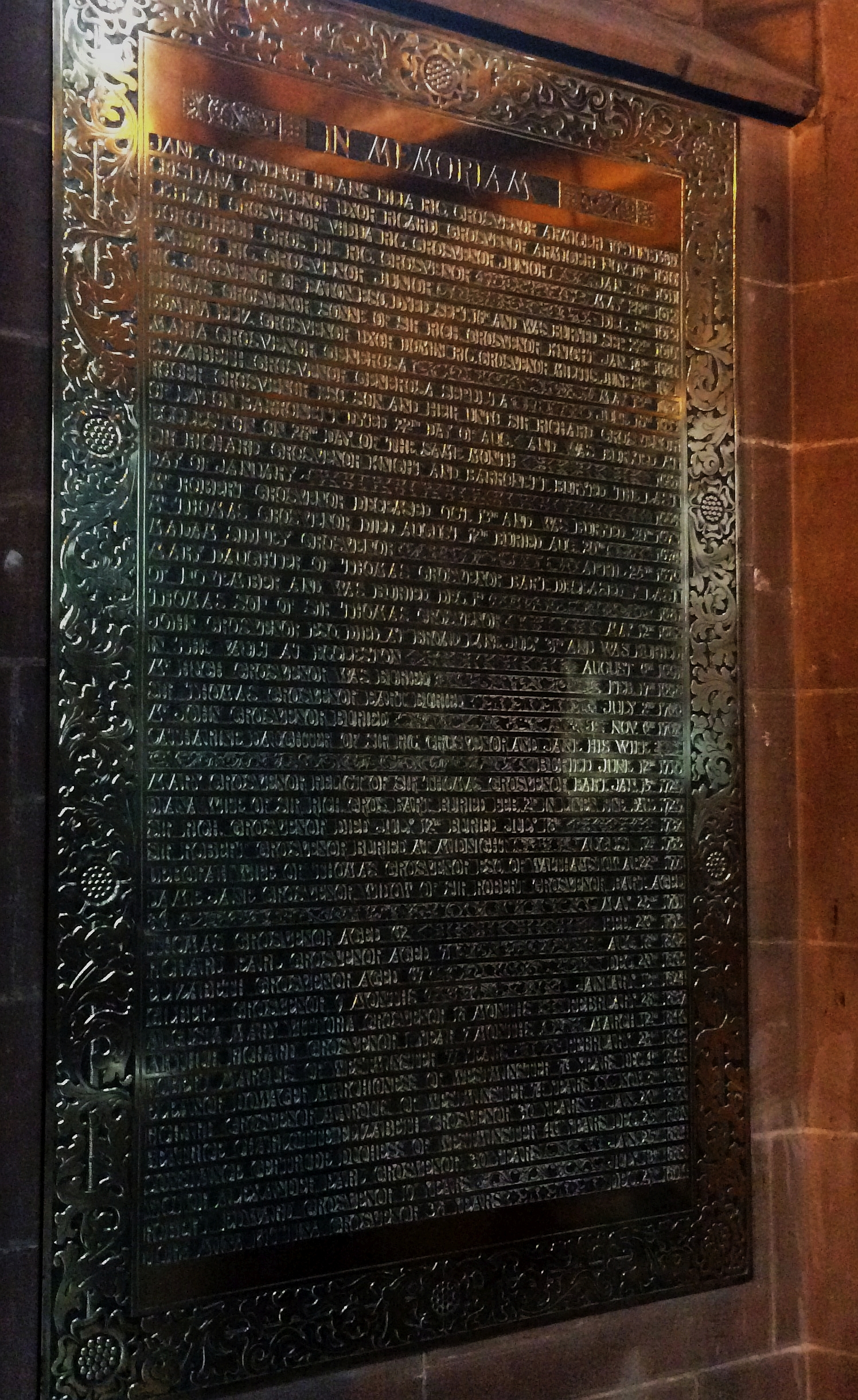
St Mary's Church, Eccleston: the tablet in the new church which lists the Grosvenors buried in the demolished old church

Grosvenor's parents had instilled "high moral principles" in their children, and these stayed with Richard throughout his life. He has been described as "of austere character and unswerving devotion to duty as family man, politician and landlord". His obituary in The Times says "he administered his vast estate with a combination of intelligence and generosity not often witnessed".

== Family ==
Lord Westminster married Lady Elizabeth Leveson-Gower, younger daughter of George Leveson-Gower, 2nd Marquess of Stafford (later 1st Duke of Sutherland), in 1819. Following their marriage, Westminster and his wife initially lived at Eaton Hall, Cheshire, the family's country house, with Lord and Lady Grosvenor. During the London season, from April each year, the family lived in Grosvenor House. In 1827 the couple visited Norway, Sweden and Russia and in 1835–36 they toured through Germany and Italy. When the 1st Marquess died in 1845 they followed the family tradition of using Eaton Hall as their country house and Grosvenor House as their London residence, where they entertained lavishly.

Lord Westminster and his wife had thirteen children, ten of whom survived into adulthood and three of whom lived into their nineties. Their second son Hugh Lupus Grosvenor succeeded him as 3rd Marquess; he was later created Duke of Westminster. Their youngest son Lord Richard Grosvenor was ennobled as Baron Stalbridge.

- Lady Eleanor Grosvenor(22 October 1820 – 4 May 1911); m. Algernon Percy, 4th Duke of Northumberland.
- Lady Mary Grosvenor (2 December 1821 – 2 January 1912); m. Thomas Parker, 6th Earl of Macclesfield.
- The Hon. Gilbert Grosvenor (10 April 1823 – 2 January 1824).
- Lady Elizabeth Grosvenor (9 July 1824 – 16 December 1899), married Beilby Lawley, 2nd Baron Wenlock.
- Hugh Grosvenor, 1st Duke of Westminster (13 October 1825 – 22 December 1899).
- Lady Evelyn Grosvenor (16 December 1826 – 25 January 1839).
- Lady Caroline Grosvenor (14 June 1828 – 24 March 1906); m. William Leigh, 2nd Baron Leigh.
- Lady Octavia Grosvenor (22 September 1829 – 29 May 1921); m. Col. Sir Michael Shaw-Stewart, 7th Baronet.
- Lady Agnes Grosvenor (24 January 1831 – 22 January 1909); m. Sir Archibald Campbell, 3rd Baronet.
- Lord Gilbert Grosvenor (6 January 1833 – 20 March 1854).
- Lady Jane Grosvenor (29 August 1834 – 13 July 1921); m. firstly, Gamel Pennington, 4th Baron Muncaster; m. secondly, Hugh Lindsay.
- Richard Grosvenor, 1st Baron Stalbridge (28 January 1837 – 18 May 1912).
- Lady Theodora Grosvenor (7 July 1840 – 24 March 1924); writer m. Thomas Merthyr Guest.

Lord Westminster died at Fonthill House, Fonthill Gifford in Wiltshire on 31 October 1869 after a short illness and was buried in the family vault in St Mary's Church, Eccleston, Cheshire. His wealth at death is recorded as being under £800,000 (equivalent to £82,330,000 as of 2025). Lady Westminster died in 1891 and was buried in St. Mary's Churchyard in Motcombe, Dorset, England expressly stating in her will the desire to be buried there among her relatives.

== Memorials ==
Westminster Memorial Hospital, Shaftesbury, Dorset, was founded in Grosvenor's memory in 1871. Near the east end of Pimlico Road in the City of Westminster, London is a drinking fountain decorated with mosaics in his honour.

== Sources ==
- Hubbard, Edward (1991), The Work of John Douglas, The Victorian Society, ISBN 0-901657-16-6

Parliament of the United Kingdom
Preceded by Thomas Grosvenor; John Egerton	Member of Parliament for Chester; 1818–1830; With: Thomas Grosvenor 1818–1826; Lord Robert Grosvenor 1826–1830	Succeeded by Lord Robert Grosvenor; Sir Philip Grey Egerton
Preceded by Davies Davenport; Wilbraham Egerton	Member of Parliament for Cheshire; 1830–1832; With: Wilbraham Egerton 1830–1831; George Wilbraham 1831–1832	constituency divided
New constituency	Member of Parliament for South Cheshire; 1832–1835; With: George Wilbraham	Succeeded by George Wilbraham; Sir Philip Grey Egerton
Honorary titles
Preceded by The Earl of Stamford	Lord Lieutenant of Cheshire; 1845–1867	Succeeded by The Lord Egerton
Political offices
Preceded by The Earl Fortescue	Lord Steward; 1850–1852	Succeeded by The Duke of Montrose
Peerage of the United Kingdom
Preceded by Robert Grosvenor	Marquess of Westminster; 1845–1869	Succeeded by Hugh Lupus Grosvenor
