= South Cheshire =

Parliamentary constituency in the United Kingdom, 1832–1868

Coordinates: 53.109°N 2.504°W

- Former county constituency for the House of Commons
- Context: 1832-1868. Extract from 1837 result: the central striped area

1832–1868
- Seats: 2
- Replaced by: Mid Cheshire; West Cheshire

South Cheshire was a parliamentary constituency in Cheshire, England represented in the House of Commons of the United Kingdom from 1832 to 1868. It was created upon the division of Cheshire in 1832. In 1868, it was abolished with North Cheshire to form parts of East Cheshire, Mid Cheshire, and West Cheshire.

== History ==
South Cheshire, or the Southern Division of Cheshire, was created as a two-member constituency under the Representation of the People Act 1832 (Great Reform Act) as one of 2 divisions, along with North Cheshire, of the Parliamentary County of Cheshire. It comprised the Hundreds of Broxton, Eddisbury, Nantwich, Northwich and Wirral, and the City and County of the City of Chester.

Under the Reform Act 1867, Cheshire was further divided with the creation of Mid Cheshire, to which the Northwich Hundred was transferred. South Cheshire was renamed West Cheshire by the Boundaries Act 1868.

== Members of Parliament ==
Election	First member	First party	Second member	Second Party
1832	George Wilbraham	Whig	Richard Grosvenor	Whig
1835	George Wilbraham	Whig	Sir Philip Grey Egerton, Bt	Conservative
1841	John Tollemache	Conservative	Sir Philip Grey Egerton, Bt	Conservative
1868	Second Reform Act: constituency abolished			

== Elections ==
General election 1865: Cheshire Southern (2 seats)
Party	Candidate	Votes	%	±%
Conservative	Philip Grey Egerton	Unopposed		
Conservative	John Tollemache	Unopposed		
Registered electors		6,826		
Conservative hold				
Conservative hold				

General election 1859: Cheshire Southern (2 seats)
Party	Candidate	Votes	%	±%
Conservative	Philip Grey Egerton	Unopposed		
Conservative	John Tollemache	Unopposed		
Registered electors		6,949		
Conservative hold				
Conservative hold				

General election 1857: Cheshire Southern (2 seats)
Party	Candidate	Votes	%	±%
Conservative	Philip Grey Egerton	Unopposed		
Conservative	John Tollemache	Unopposed		
Registered electors		7,068		
Conservative hold				
Conservative hold				

General election 1852: Cheshire Southern (2 seats)
Party	Candidate	Votes	%	±%
Conservative	Philip Grey Egerton	Unopposed		
Conservative	John Tollemache	Unopposed		
Registered electors		8,117		
Conservative hold				
Conservative hold				

General election 1847: Cheshire Southern (2 seats)
Party	Candidate	Votes	%	±%
Conservative	Philip Grey Egerton	Unopposed		
Conservative	John Tollemache	Unopposed		
Registered electors		8,735		
Conservative hold				
Conservative hold				

General election 1841: Cheshire Southern (2 seats)
Party	Candidate	Votes	%	±%
Conservative	Philip Grey Egerton	3,110	36.5	+0.9
Conservative	John Tollemache	3,034	35.7	+5.6
Whig	George Wilbraham	2,365	27.8	−6.5
Majority		669	7.9	+6.6
Turnout		c. 5,437	c. 71.1	c. −9.5
Registered electors		7,645		
Conservative hold		Swing	+2.1	
Conservative gain from Whig		Swing	+4.4	

General election 1837: Cheshire Southern (2 seats)
Party	Candidate	Votes	%
Conservative	Philip Grey Egerton	3,135	35.6
Whig	George Wilbraham	3,015	34.3
Conservative	Edwin Corbett	2,646	30.1
Turnout		5,712	80.6
Registered electors		7,084	
Majority		120	1.3
Conservative hold			
Majority		369	4.2
Whig hold			

General election 1835: Cheshire Southern (2 seats)
Party	Candidate	Votes	%
Conservative	Philip Grey Egerton	Unopposed	
Whig	George Wilbraham	Unopposed	
Registered electors		6,343	
Conservative gain from Whig			
Whig hold			

General election 1832: Cheshire Southern (2 seats)
Party	Candidate	Votes	%
Whig	George Wilbraham	2,661	36.1
Whig	Richard Grosvenor	2,406	32.7
Tory	Philip Grey Egerton	2,297	31.2
Majority		109	1.5
Turnout		4,756	92.7
Registered electors		5,130	
Whig win (new seat)			
Whig win (new seat)			

== See also ==
- List of former United Kingdom Parliament constituencies
- History of parliamentary constituencies and boundaries in Cheshire
