= Henry James Tollemache =

British politician (1846-1939)

Henry Tollemache in 1895

Henry James Tollemache (5 July 1846 – 2 April 1939) was a British Conservative politician and landowner in Cheshire. He served as the Member of Parliament successively for West Cheshire (1881–85) and Eddisbury (1885–1906), concentrating on agricultural issues. He was Deputy Lieutenant (1893) and Vice-Lieutenant of Cheshire (from 1924), and was also a justice of the peace and president of the Cheshire Agricultural Society.

== Early life and education ==
Henry Tollemache was born on 5 July 1846 at Dorfold Hall, Acton, in Cheshire. He was the third child and eldest son of Wilbraham Spencer Tollemache and Anne Tomkinson of Dorfold Hall. His father was the younger son of Admiral John Richard Delap Halliday (who assumed the surname and arms of Tollemache in 1821) and the brother of John Tollemache, 1st Baron Tollemache.

Henry Tollemache was educated at Eton, where he studied with the Reverend F. E. Durnford, and then at Christ Church, Oxford (1870–72). Before entering Parliament, he was a captain in the Cheshire Yeomanry Cavalry.

== Parliamentary career and public service ==
Tollemache was elected to one of the West Cheshire parliamentary seats in a by-election on 25 April 1881, caused by the death of Sir Philip de Malpas Grey-Egerton. His majority was 382 votes. After redistribution of seats eliminated that constituency, he stood successfully for the new seat of Eddisbury at the general election of 1885, and retained that seat until 1906, when he retired. He rarely spoke in the House, and most of his work related to agricultural issues; he supported the ploughing campaign during the First World War, advocated against the government policy of mass culling of cattle to counter foot-and-mouth disease outbreaks, and supported agricultural protectionism. A staunch Conservative, after leaving parliament, he chaired the local branch of the Conservative party until 1935. He was also appointed a justice of the peace in 1874, and chaired the Nantwich Bench for 42 years until 1936. He served as the senior Deputy Lieutenant of Cheshire in 1893 and was appointed Vice-Lieutenant of the county in 1924, succeeding Sir George Dixon.

He was a Cheshire landowner, with 2000–3000 acres in the Dorfold Estate, including several dairy farms. He served as president of the Cheshire Agricultural Society in 1882, 1894 and 1903, and was also president of the Dairy Association. During the restoration of St Mary's Church, Acton in 1897, he funded the construction of a stone organ loft. He donated the land on which Nantwich Cottage Hospital was built (opened in 1911), and was the institution's first president until his death. He was manager and trustee of Acton School, and a governor of Nantwich Grammar School. He was one of the directors of the Cheshire and North Wales Newspaper Company, publishers of the Cheshire Observer and Chester Courant local newspapers, from its establishment in 1899.

== Personal life ==
In 1904, Tollemache married Katharine Mary Frances Streatfeild (née Arkwright; the widow of Edward Champion Streatfeild); his wife died in 1916. The couple had no surviving children, and Dorfold Hall passed to his nephew, Christopher F. Roundell, the son of his eldest sister, Julia (1845–1931). A painting of Tollemache and his sister Julia by "Hurleston" (possibly Frederick Yeates Hurlstone) hangs in the Dining Room of Dorfold Hall. Tollemache was a keen cricketer; he played cricket for Nantwich Cricket Club with A. N. Hornby, and was the club's president. He was a lifelong Cheshire Hunt member, considered to be its oldest at the time of his death, and served as president of the Tarporley Hunt Club.

Henry Tollemache died at Dorfold Hall on 2 April 1939, after a brief illness. He was cremated at Manchester Crematorium, and his ashes were buried at St Mary's Church, Acton.

Parliament of the United Kingdom
Preceded by John Tollemache; Sir Philip Grey Egerton	Member of Parliament for West Cheshire; 1881–1885; With: Wilbraham Tollemache	constituency abolished
New constituency	Member of Parliament for Eddisbury; 1885–1906	Succeeded by Arthur Stanley
