= 1872 West Cheshire by-election =

UK Parliamentary by-election

The 1872 West Cheshire by-election was contested on 17 February 1872 due to the resignation of the incumbent Conservative MP, John Tollemache. It was won by the unopposed Conservative candidate Wilbraham Tollemache.
