= West Cheshire (constituency) =

Parliamentary constituency in the United Kingdom, 1868–1885

- Former county constituency for the House of Commons

1868–1885
- Seats: two
- Created from: South Cheshire
- Replaced by: Eddisbury; Wirral; Crewe; Northwich

West Cheshire is a former parliamentary constituency, which returned two Members of Parliament (MPs) to the House of Commons of the Parliament of the United Kingdom.

== History ==
Under the Reform Act 1867, the Parliamentary County of Cheshire was divided into three two-member constituencies. This was achieved by the creation of Mid Cheshire which comprised the Hundred of Bucklow from North Cheshire and the Hundred of Northwich from South Cheshire. Under the Boundary Act 1868, North Cheshire and South Cheshire were renamed East Cheshire and West Cheshire respectively.

Under the Redistribution of Seats Act 1885, the three 2-member seats were abolished and re-divided into eight single-member constituencies: Altrincham, Crewe, Eddisbury, Hyde, Knutsford, Macclesfield, Northwich and Wirral.

== Boundaries ==
1868–1885: The Hundreds of Broxton, Eddisbury, Nantwich, and Wirral, and the City and County of the City of Chester.

== Members of Parliament ==
Election	First member	First party	Second member	Second Party
1868	Sir Philip Grey Egerton, Bt	Conservative	John Tollemache	Conservative
1872 by-election	Sir Philip Grey Egerton, Bt	Conservative	Hon. Wilbraham Tollemache	Conservative
1881 by-election	Henry James Tollemache	Conservative	Hon. Wilbraham Tollemache	Conservative
1885	Constituency abolished			

== Election results ==
=== Elections in the 1860s ===
General election 1868: West Cheshire
Party	Candidate	Votes	%	±%
Conservative	Philip Grey Egerton	Unopposed		
Conservative	John Tollemache	Unopposed		
Registered electors		8,894		
Conservative win (new seat)				
Conservative win (new seat)				

=== Elections in the 1870s ===
Tollemache's resignation caused a by-election.

By-election, 17 Feb 1872: West Cheshire
Party	Candidate	Votes	%	±%
Conservative	Wilbraham Tollemache	Unopposed		
Conservative hold				

General election 1874: West Cheshire
Party	Candidate	Votes	%	±%
Conservative	Philip Grey Egerton	Unopposed		
Conservative	Wilbraham Tollemache	Unopposed		
Registered electors		10,169		
Conservative hold				
Conservative hold				

=== Elections in the 1880s ===
General election 1880: West Cheshire
Party	Candidate	Votes	%	±%
Conservative	Philip Grey Egerton	4,773	27.7	N/A
Conservative	Wilbraham Tollemache	4,637	27.0	N/A
Liberal	William West	4,009	23.3	New
Liberal	Charles Crompton	3,785	22.0	New
Majority		628	3.7	N/A
Turnout		8,602 (est)	77.5 (est)	N/A
Registered electors		11,097		
Conservative hold		Swing	N/A	
Conservative hold		Swing	N/A	

Egerton's death caused a by-election.

By-election, 25 Apr 1881: West Cheshire
Party	Candidate	Votes	%	±%
Conservative	Henry James Tollemache	4,800	52.1	−2.6
Liberal	James Tomkinson	4,418	47.9	+2.6
Majority		382	4.2	+0.5
Turnout		9,218	75.1	−2.4 (est)
Registered electors		12,270		
Conservative hold		Swing	−2.6	

== See also ==
- List of former United Kingdom Parliament constituencies
- History of parliamentary constituencies and boundaries in Cheshire

== Sources ==
- Leigh Rayment's Historical List of MPs – Constituencies beginning with "C" (part 3)
