= Wilbraham Spencer Tollemache =

- Born: 3 October 1807; Nantwich, Cheshire
- Died: 15 February 1890 (aged 82); Nantwich, Cheshire
- Spouse: Anne Tomkinson
- Children: Julia Anne Elizabeth; Henry James; Alice Georgina; Archibald Edward
- Parent(s): Admiral John Richard Delap Halliday and Lady Elizabeth Stratford
- Relatives: Brother:John Tollemache, 1st Baron Tollemache

Wilbraham Spencer Tollemache (3 October 1807 – 15 February 1890) was an English soldier, JP and high sheriff.

== Early life ==
Wilbraham Spencer Tollemache was born on 3 October 1807. He was the younger son of Admiral John Richard Delap Halliday (who assumed the surname and arms of Tollemache in 1821) and his wife, Lady Elizabeth Stratford. His eldest brother was John Tollemache.

== Career ==
He served in the Rifle Brigade after the Napoleonic Wars and was appointed first lieutenant in 1828. His portrait was commissioned from Alexandre-Jean Dubois-Drahonet by William IV in 1832 and remains in the Royal collection.

Tollemache was a JP for many years and was appointed High Sheriff of Cheshire in 1865.

== Family ==
In 1844, Tollemache married Anne Tomkinson of Dorfold Hall, Acton, in Cheshire. Four of their children survived to adulthood:

- Julia Anne Elizabeth Tollemache (1845 – 28 December 1931). Julia married Charles Savile Roundell in 1874. She was an active historian and wrote a DNB entry for Anthony Browne and a history of Cowdray. Roundell inherited Dorfold Hall on Wilbraham's death and Julia, in turn, inherited when widowed in 1909.
- Henry James Tollemache (5 July 1846 – 2 April 1939)
- Alice Georgina Tollemache (1850 – after 1911)
- Rev. Archibald Edward Tollemache (25 January 1851 – 6 April 1930).

Wilbraham Spencer Tollemache died on 15 February 1890, aged 82.
