= Birkenhead Enfranchisement Act 1861 =

Act of the Parliament of the United Kingdom

Birkenhead Enfranchisement Act 1861 (Note: The citation of this act by this short title was authorised by section 1 of, and the first schedule to, the Short Titles Act 1896. Due to the repeal of those provisions it is now authorised by section 19(2) of the Interpretation Act 1978.)
- Act of Parliament
- Parliament of the United Kingdom
- Long title: An Act for the Appropriation of the Seats vacated by the Disfranchisement of the Boroughs of Sudbury and Saint Alban.
- Citation: 24 & 25 Vict. c. 112
- Introduced by: Sir George Cornewall Lewis, 2nd Baronet (Commons)
- Territorial extent: United Kingdom

Dates
- Royal assent: 6 August 1861
- Commencement: 6 August 1861 (Note: The Acts of Parliament (Commencement) Act 1793.)
- Repealed: 23 May 1950
Other legislation
| Repealed by | Statute Law Revision Act 1875; Statute Law Revision Act 1878; Statute Law Revision Act 1892; Statute Law Revision Act 1950 |

Status: Repealed

Text of statute as originally enacted

The Birkenhead Enfranchisement Act 1861 (24 & 25 Vict. c. 112), also known as the Appropriation of Seats (Sudbury and Saint Alban's) Act was an act of the Parliament of the United Kingdom that reallocated four seats of the House of Commons that became available after the disenfranchisement of the boroughs of St Albans and Sudbury. A new parliamentary borough of Birkenhead was created, the existing single-member West Riding of Yorkshire constituency was split into two divisions and the Lancashire South constituency received an extra member of parliament.

The two abolished constituencies had been disenfranchised for corruption: Sudbury in 1844 and St Albans in 1852.

The additional seats at Birkenhead and Lancashire were filled by by-elections soon after the passage of the act in 1861. The changes in the West Riding of Yorkshire did not come into effect until the 1865 general election.

== Subsequent developments ==
The whole act, so far as unrepealed, was repealed by section 1(1) of, and the first schedule to, the Statute Law Revision Act 1950 (14 Geo. 6. c. 6), which came into force on 23 May 1950.
