= Jean le Sellier =

16th-century English politician

Member of Parliament for Tournai
- In office 1513 - 1515
- Preceded by: New seat
- Succeeded by: unknown

Jean le Sellier (by 1471–by 6 October 1517) was a politician who was one of the two Members (MP) of the Parliament of England for Tournai in the last session of the parliament commenced in 1512, following the conquest of the town by Henry VIII in 1513.
