= Tournai (Parliament of England constituency) =

- Former borough constituency for the House of Commons

1513–1519
- Seats: 2

Tournai (French pronunciation: [tuʁnɛ]) was a possible former constituency of the Parliament of England between 1513 and 1519. It was created after the Kingdom of England captured the town from the Kingdom of France. The constituency was abolished in 1519 following the return of the town to France in exchange for a payment of 600,000 crowns.

== Overview ==
Tournai, the only town (now city) in modern Belgium ever to have been ruled by England, was under English control from around 23 September 1513 (after its capture from France during the 1513 Battle of Guinegate) and remained so until its return in 1519 to France upon the payment of 600,000 crowns following the Treaty of London in 1518. Aged 22, Henry VIII entered the town ceremonially on 25 September 1513. During part of the time during which the town was under English sovereignty, it was possibly represented in the Parliament of England by two Members of Parliament. Henry promised the town representation and allowed for them to use the French customary member's deputies to elect Tournai's MP. The only known member for the constituency was Jean Le Sellier.

However, Oxford historian C. S. L. Davies has argued that no such constituency ever existed, claiming that Henry viewed Tournai as a part of his claim to the Kingdom of France rather than as a new integral part of the Kingdom of England.

== Election ==
An election is believed by some to have taken place in about December 1513. It is not known if Tournai was represented in the 1515 Parliament as though Henry had requested the return of all previously elected members, Le Sellier was recorded as still being in Tournai four days after the Opening of Parliament.

== Members of Parliament ==
Summoned	Elected	Assembled	Dissolved	First Member	Second Member
28 November 1511	1513	4 February 1512	4 March 1514	Jean Le Sellier	unknown
23 November 1514	1515	5 February 1515	22 December 1515	unknown	unknown

== Coinage ==
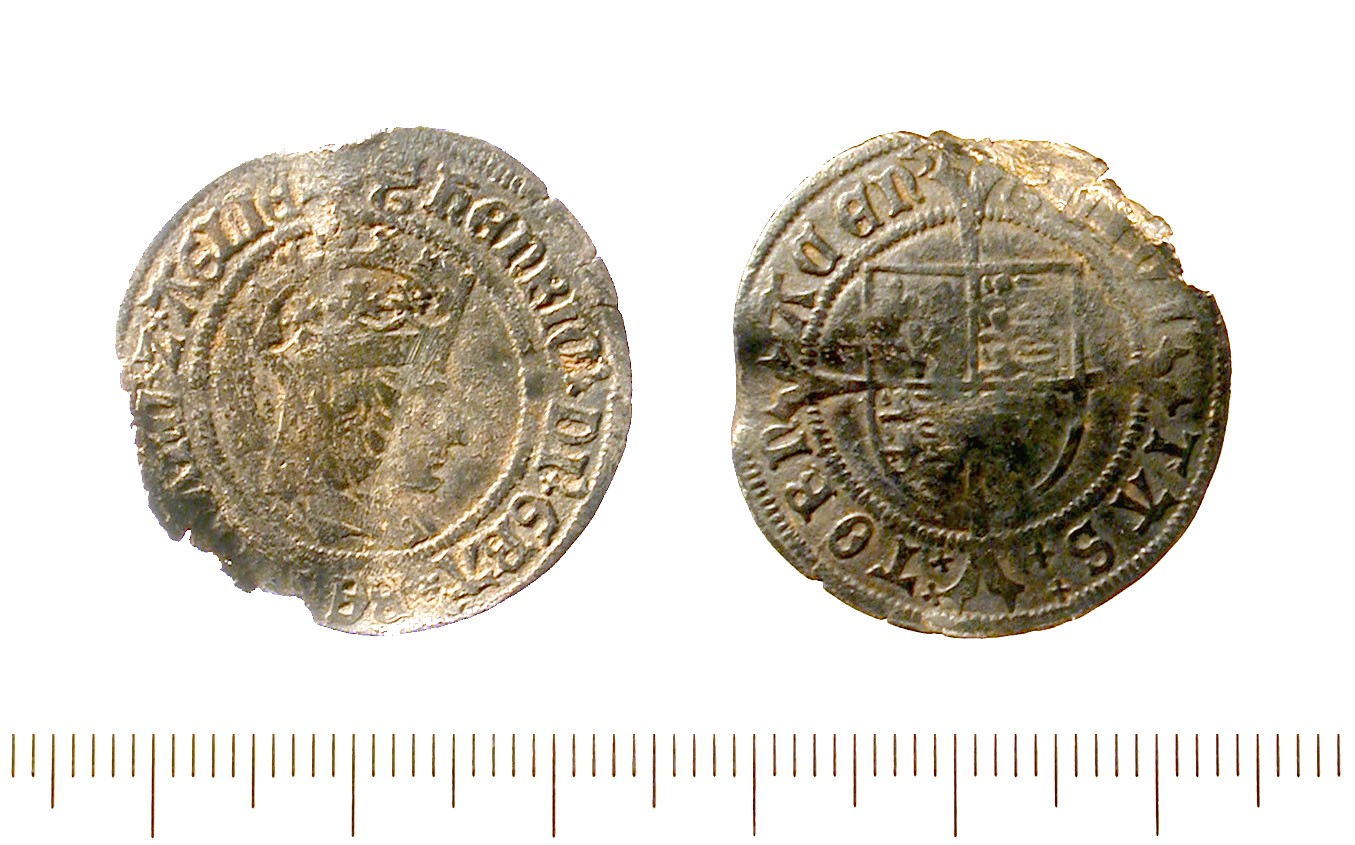
Groat of Henry VIII, Mint of Tournacen, 1513

Groat and half-groat coins were issued without a portrait of King Henry VIII but did display his name. Dated 1513, these were struck subsequent to the town's capture in 1513 from France and nowadays are exceptionally rare especially since they are the earliest British dated coins. The coin was struck naming Henry as "King of France and England" when English coins from the same period had the kingdoms reversed.
