= George Wilbraham =

English Whig MP

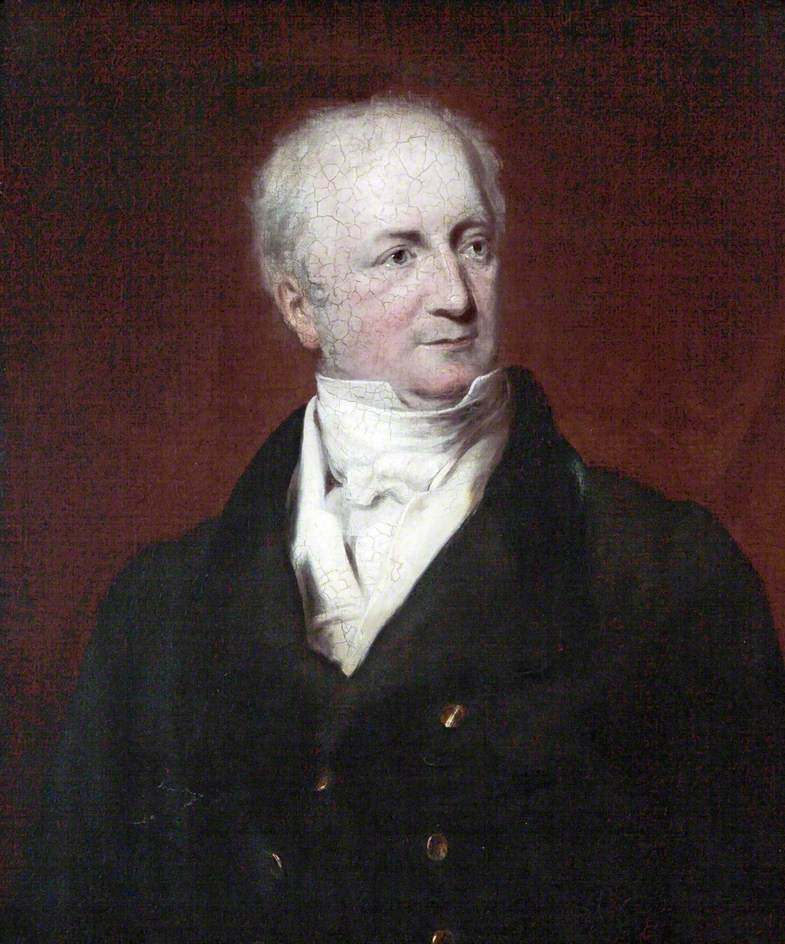
George Wilbraham by Thomas Henry Illidge.

George Wilbraham, FRS (8 March 1779 – 24 January 1852) of Delamere, Cheshire was an English Whig MP.

He was the eldest surviving son of George Wilbraham, MP of Delamere Lodge (but previously of Nantwich, Cheshire) and educated at Rugby School and Trinity College, Cambridge. He succeeded his father to Delamere Lodge in 1813.

He was elected MP for Stockbridge in 1826, for Cheshire in 1831 and for the newly created Cheshire South in 1832. He was appointed High Sheriff of Cheshire for 1844–45.

Wilbraham was elected a Fellow of the Royal Society in 1821.

He married Lady Anne Fortescue, the daughter of Hugh Fortescue, 1st Earl Fortescue, and had five sons. He died in 1852. He was succeeded by his eldest son, George Fortescue Wilbraham.
