= 2016 British baseball season =

- League: British Baseball Federation
- Sport: Baseball
- Duration: 3 April 2016 – 28 August 2016

Regular Season
- League: London Mets

National Baseball Championship
- Champions: Southampton Mustangs
- Runners-up: London Mets

BBF seasons
- 2015 2017

The 2016 season was the 87th season of competitive baseball in the United Kingdom.

The season began on 3 April 2016 with the opening game of the National Baseball League with all other British Baseball Federation leagues set to begin on 10 April 2016.

== BBF Affiliated Leagues ==
=== National Baseball League ===
Locations of the 2016 National Baseball League teams

Legend
Qualified for National Baseball Championship series

| Teams | W | L | Pct. | RF | RA |
|---|---|---|---|---|---|
| London Mets | 26 | 2 | .929 | 326 | 104 |
| Southampton Mustangs | 25 | 3 | .893 | 340 | 81 |
| London Capitals | 16 | 11 | .593 | 209 | 191 |
| Essex Arrows | 14 | 13 | .519 | 213 | 250 |
| Brighton Jets | 9 | 21 | .300 | 189 | 303 |
| Herts Falcons | 6 | 24 | .200 | 138 | 319 |
| South London Pirates | 4 | 26 | .133 | 151 | 318 |

Leaders
| Category | Player (Team) | Value |
|---|---|---|
| Leading Hitter | Grant Delzoppo (Mets) | .532 |
| Leading Home Runs | Gary Davison (Mustangs) | 8 |
| Best ERA | Spencer Kreisberg (Mustangs) | 1.27 |
| Most wins | Francisco Gonzalez (Mustangs) | 7 |

==== National Baseball Championship ====
27 August 2016, 3:30 PM at Farnham Park in Slough, England
| Team | 1 | 2 | 3 | 4 | 5 | 6 | 7 | 8 | 9 | R | H | E |
|---|---|---|---|---|---|---|---|---|---|---|---|---|
| Southampton | 0 | 0 | 0 | 0 | 0 | 0 | 0 | 0 | 0 | 0 | 3 | 0 |
| London | 0 | 0 | 0 | 0 | 0 | 0 | 1 | 0 | x | 1 | 5 | 1 |
WP: Tyson Walker (1–0) LP: Spencer Kreisberg (0–1)

28 August 2016, 12:45 PM at Farnham Park in Slough, England
| Team | 1 | 2 | 3 | 4 | 5 | 6 | 7 | 8 | 9 | R | H | E |
|---|---|---|---|---|---|---|---|---|---|---|---|---|
| London | 0 | 0 | 0 | 0 | 3 | 0 | 0 | 0 | 0 | 3 | 6 | 2 |
| Southampton | 2 | 0 | 3 | 0 | 0 | 2 | 0 | 0 | x | 7 | 8 | 3 |
WP: Rei Martinez (1–0) LP: Elijah Hackney-Rose (0–1)

28 August 2016, 3:30 PM at Farnham Park in Slough, England
| Team | 1 | 2 | 3 | 4 | 5 | 6 | 7 | 8 | 9 | R | H | E |
|---|---|---|---|---|---|---|---|---|---|---|---|---|
| Southampton | 2 | 6 | 0 | 0 | 0 | 0 | 1 | x | x | 9 | 10 | 0 |
| London | 1 | 0 | 0 | 1 | 0 | 2 | 0 | x | x | 4 | 7 | 4 |
WP: Alberto Rodriguez (1–0) LP: Sam Sproule (0–1); Home runs: SOT: None; LDN: Freddy Mosier

All results are up to date through the end of the season

=== AAA ===
Locations of the teams playing in AAA in 2016

| Teams | W | L | Pct. | RF | RA |
|---|---|---|---|---|---|
| Richmond Knights | 16 | 6 | .727 | 243 | 141 |
| Oxford Kings | 14 | 8 | .636 | 158 | 150 |
| London Mammoths | 8 | 12 | .400 | 158 | 157 |
| Essex Redbacks | 4 | 16 | .200 | 76 | 197 |

Leaders
| Category | Player (Team) | Value |
|---|---|---|
| Leading Hitter | Scott Bolohan (Kings) | .520 |
| Leading Home Runs | Rael Mackay (Knights) | 4 |
| Best ERA | Josh Pines (Mammoths) | 2.39 |
| Most wins | Masaharu Egawa (Kings) | 5 |

AAA National Championships

28 August 2016, 10:00 am at Farnham Park in Slough, England
| Team | 1 | 2 | 3 | 4 | 5 | 6 | 7 | R | H | E |
|---|---|---|---|---|---|---|---|---|---|---|
| Oxford | 1 | 3 | 4 | 0 | 0 | 0 | 0 | 8 | 7 | 5 |
| Richmond | 4 | 2 | 3 | 0 | 1 | 2 | 0 | 12 | 10 | 4 |
WP: Adam Ramsey (1–0) LP: Chris Hays (0–1)

All results are up to date through the end of the season

=== AA ===
Locations of the teams playing in AA in 2016

Central

| Teams | W | L | Pct. | RF | RA |
|---|---|---|---|---|---|
| Birmingham Bandits | 18 | 3 | .857 | 224 | 97 |
| Milton Keynes Bucks | 13 | 9 | .591 | 203 | 146 |
| Leicester Blue Sox | 12 | 13 | .480 | 191 | 206 |
| Nottingham Rebels | 10 | 12 | .455 | 185 | 167 |
| Long Eaton Storm | 8 | 14 | .364 | 152 | 226 |
| Stourbridge Titans | 6 | 16 | .273 | 134 | 247 |

South Pool A

| Teams | W | L | Pct. | RF | RA |
|---|---|---|---|---|---|
| East London Latin Boys | 17 | 3 | .850 | 308 | 133 |
| Daws Hill Spitfires | 17 | 3 | .850 | 293 | 139 |
| Sidewinders | 10 | 10 | .500 | 187 | 194 |
| London Marauders | 8 | 12 | .400 | 210 | 207 |
| Brentwood Stags | 0 | 18 | .000 | 59 | 363 |

South Pool B

| Teams | W | L | Pct. | RF | RA |
|---|---|---|---|---|---|
| Richmond Dragons | 14 | 6 | .700 | 229 | 132 |
| Southampton Mustangs II | 11 | 7 | .611 | 147 | 102 |
| Brighton Redhawks | 10 | 10 | .500 | 200 | 193 |
| South London Pirates III | 0 | 18 | .000 | 39 | 209 |

Leaders
| Category | Player (Team) | Value |
|---|---|---|
| Leading Hitter | Elvin Mencias de la Cruz (East London) | .875 |
| Leading Home Runs | Shannon Henry (Nottingham); Miguel Martinez (Birmingham) | 9 |
| Best ERA | Henry Collins (Daws Hill) | 0.00 |
| Most wins | Mario Escobedo (Birmingham) | 10 |

All results are up to date through the end of the season

=== A ===
Locations of the teams playing in Single-A in 2016

Pool A

| Teams | W | L | Pct. | RF | RA |
|---|---|---|---|---|---|
| Milton Keynes Coyotes | 1 | 0 | 1.000 | 17 | 2 |
| Birmingham Outlaws | 0 | 0 | .000 | 0 | 0 |
| Cambridge Monarchs | 0 | 0 | .000 | 0 | 0 |
| Herts Hawks | 0 | 0 | .000 | 0 | 0 |
| Northants Centurions | 0 | 0 | .000 | 0 | 0 |
| London Mercenaries | 0 | 1 | .000 | 2 | 17 |

Pool B

| Teams | W | L | Pct. | RF | RA |
|---|---|---|---|---|---|
| Essex Archers | 1 | 0 | 1.000 | 20 | 5 |
| Haverhill Blackjacks | 0 | 0 | .000 | 0 | 0 |
| Herts Raptors | 0 | 0 | .000 | 0 | 0 |
| London Musketeers | 0 | 0 | .000 | 0 | 0 |
| Old Timers | 0 | 1 | .000 | 5 | 20 |

Pool C

| Teams | W | L | Pct. | RF | RA |
|---|---|---|---|---|---|
| Richmond Dukes | 1 | 0 | 1.000 | 29 | 19 |
| Guildford Mavericks | 0 | 0 | .000 | 0 | 0 |
| Romford Wasps | 0 | 0 | .000 | 0 | 0 |
| Tonbridge Wildcats | 0 | 0 | .000 | 0 | 0 |
| Bracknell Inferno | 0 | 1 | .000 | 19 | 29 |

Pool D

| Teams | W | L | Pct. | RF | RA |
|---|---|---|---|---|---|
| Kent Mariners | 1 | 0 | 1.000 | 17 | 15 |
| Richmond Squires | 0 | 0 | .000 | 0 | 0 |
| Guildford Millers | 0 | 0 | .000 | 0 | 0 |
| Tonbridge Bobcats | 0 | 0 | .000 | 0 | 0 |
| Forest Glade Redbacks | 0 | 1 | .000 | 15 | 17 |

Leaders
| Category | Player (Team) | Value |
|---|---|---|
| Leading Hitter | Five players | 1.000 |
| Leading Home Runs | None | 0 |
| Best ERA | Oliver Thompson (Dukes) | 0.00 |
| Most wins | Two players | 1 |

All results are up to date as of 18 April 2016

=== Northern Conference ===
Locations of the teams playing in the Northern Conference in 2016

Legend
Qualified for Northern Playoffs

East

| Teams | W | L | Pct. | RF | RA |
|---|---|---|---|---|---|
| Hull Scorpions | 17 | 7 | .708 | 249 | 199 |
| Sheffield Bladerunners | 13 | 13 | .500 | 266 | 232 |
| Harrogate Tigers | 11 | 14 | .440 | 209 | 221 |
| County Durham Spartans | 8 | 16 | .333 | 182 | 268 |

Central

| Teams | W | L | Pct. | RF | RA |
|---|---|---|---|---|---|
| Halton Jaguars | 17 | 5 | .773 | 280 | 101 |
| Liverpool Twojans | 13 | 13 | .500 | 264 | 281 |
| Manchester Torrent | 2 | 24 | .077 | 112 | 424 |
| Oldham North Stars | 1 | 19 | .050 | 38 | 244 |

West

| Teams | W | L | Pct. | RF | RA |
|---|---|---|---|---|---|
| Liverpool Trojans | 24 | 2 | .923 | 381 | 127 |
| Cartmel Valley Lions | 21 | 3 | .875 | 285 | 76 |
| Manchester A's | 12 | 15 | .444 | 188 | 195 |
| Bolton Robots of Doom | 6 | 14 | .300 | 96 | 182 |

Leaders
| Category | Player (Team) | Value |
|---|---|---|
| Leading Hitter | Gavin Marshall (Scorpions) | .833 |
| Leading Home Runs | Victor Juarez (Trojans) | 5 |
| Best ERA | Ryan Patterson (Lions) | 1.24 |
| Most wins | Luke Armstrong (Lions) | 9 |

All results are up to date as of 18 April 2016

== Non-BBF Affiliated Leagues ==
=== South West Baseball League ===
Locations of the teams playing in the South West Baseball League in 2016

Division 1

| Teams | W | L | Pct. | RF | RA |
|---|---|---|---|---|---|
| Taunton Muskets | 9 | 0 | 1.000 | 182 | 12 |
| Bristol Badgers | 6 | 3 | .667 | 158 | 88 |
| Bristol Bats | 5 | 4 | .556 | 143 | 113 |
| Plymouth Mariners | 4 | 5 | .444 | 185 | 142 |

Division 2

| Teams | W | L | Pct. | RF | RA |
|---|---|---|---|---|---|
| Exeter Spitfires | 5 | 5 | .500 | 160 | 211 |
| Taunton Musketoons | 4 | 6 | .400 | 145 | 259 |
| Newton Brewers | 0 | 10 | .000 | 94 | 242 |

All results are up to date through the end of the season

=== Baseball Scotland League ===
Locations of the teams playing in the Baseball Scotland League in 2016

| Teams | W | L | Pct. | RF | RA |
|---|---|---|---|---|---|
| Edinburgh Diamond Devils | 3 | 0 | 1.000 | 40 | 12 |
| Glasgow Galaxy | 2 | 1 | .667 | 26 | 18 |
| Edinburgh Cannons | 1 | 1 | .500 | 22 | 20 |
| Glasgow Comets | 0 | 2 | .000 | 8 | 25 |
| Edinburgh Giants | 0 | 2 | .000 | 5 | 26 |

All results are up to date as of 27 April 2016

== See also ==
- British Baseball Hall of Fame
- Baseball awards#United Kingdom
- Baseball awards#Europe
- Baseball in the United Kingdom
