= 2017 British baseball season =

- League: British Baseball Federation
- Sport: Baseball
- Duration: 2 April 2017 – September 2017

Regular season

National Baseball Championship

BBF seasons
- 2016 2018

The 2017 season was the 88th season of competitive baseball in the United Kingdom.

The season began on 2 April 2017 and ran until early September.

== BFF Affiliated Leagues ==
=== National Baseball League ===
Locations of the 2017 National Baseball League teams

The NBL consisted of 30 games spread from 2 April to 27 August, with the National Championship series played in September

Legend
Qualified for National Baseball Championship series

Teams	W	L	Pct.	RF	RA
London Mets	16	4	.800	229	93
Southampton Mustangs	14	7	.667	222	108
London Capitals	16	9	.640	239	193
Essex Arrows	9	11	.450	175	233
Herts Falcons	7	17	.292	154	286
Brighton Jets	3	17	.150	122	228

Leaders
Category	Player (Team)	Value
Leading Hitter	Jarrod Pretorious (Herts)	.600
Leading Home Runs	Carlos Dominguez (Mets)	7
Best ERA	Ethan Solomon (Mets)	1.17
Most wins	Richard Chesterton (Essex)	4

Updated through 30 July.

=== Triple-A ===
Locations of the 2017 Triple-A South Division Teams

The Triple-A season will consist of 22 games played from 23 April to 20 August, with the playoffs in September.

Legend
Will play AA league winner in Semi-Final
Will play Northern Conference Triple-A playoff winner in Semi-Final

Teams	W	L	Pct.	RF	RA
Richmond Knights	17	2	.895	199	88
London Mammoths	14	9	.571	190	159
Taunton Tigers	13	11	.591	165	162
London Meteorites	9	10	.474	144	121
Essex Redbacks	5	16	.238	0	0
Oxford Kings	4	14	.222	105	193

Updated through 30 July

=== Double-A ===
Locations of the 2017 Double-A Teams in the Midlands region
Locations of the 2017 Double-A Teams in the Southeast region

==== Central Division ====
Teams	W	L	Pct.	RF	RA
Birmingham Bandits	18	0	1.000	228	52
Long Eaton Storm	8	8	.500	132	120
Stourbridge Titans	9	13	.409	181	186
Leicester Blue Sox	9	11	.450	159	240
Milton Keynes Bucks	2	14	.125	99	201

Updated 30 July

==== South Division ====
Pool A

Teams	W	L	Pct.	RF	RA
Sidewinders	12	2	.857	185	118
Herts Hawks	15	3	.833	283	148
East London Latin Boys	15	3	.833	239	123
London Maurauders	8	7	.533	180	170
Daws Hill Spitfires	4	11	.267	134	194
Brentwood Stags	2	15	.188	104	288

Updated through 30 July.

Pool B

Teams	W	L	Pct.	RF	RA
Tonbridge Wildcats	14	4	.778	235	104
Richmond Dragons	11	7	.611	238	189
Richmond Barons	6	11	.353	182	276
Brighton Redhawks	6	12	.333	266	256
Southampton Mustangs	6	12	.333	219	222
Guildford Mavericks	2	14	.125	114	291

Updated 30 July

=== Single-A ===
==== Central ====
Teams	W	L	Pct.	RF	RA
Northants Centurions	0	0	0	0	0
Stourbridge Tomahawks	0	0	0	0	0
Birmingham Outlaws	0	0	0	0	0
East Midlands Wolfpack	0	0	0	0	0

==== South ====
Teams	W	L	Pct.	RF	RA
Essex Archers	0	0	0	0	0
London Musketeers	0	0	0	0	0
Bracknell Inferno	0	0	0	0	0
Romford Wasps	0	0	0	0	0
Guildford Millers	0	0	0	0	0
Tonbridge Bobcats	0	0	0	0	0
Norwich Iceni	0	0	0	0	0
Cambridge Monarchs	0	0	0	0	0
Herts Raptors	0	0	0	0	0
Old Timers	0	0	0	0	0
Richmond Dukes	0	0	0	0	0
Forest Glade Redbacks	0	0	0	0	0
Kent Mariners	0	0	0	0	0
Guildford Gold Cats	0	0	0	0	0
Cambridge Monarchs	0	0	0	0	0

== Non-BFF Affiliated Leagues ==
=== South West Baseball League ===
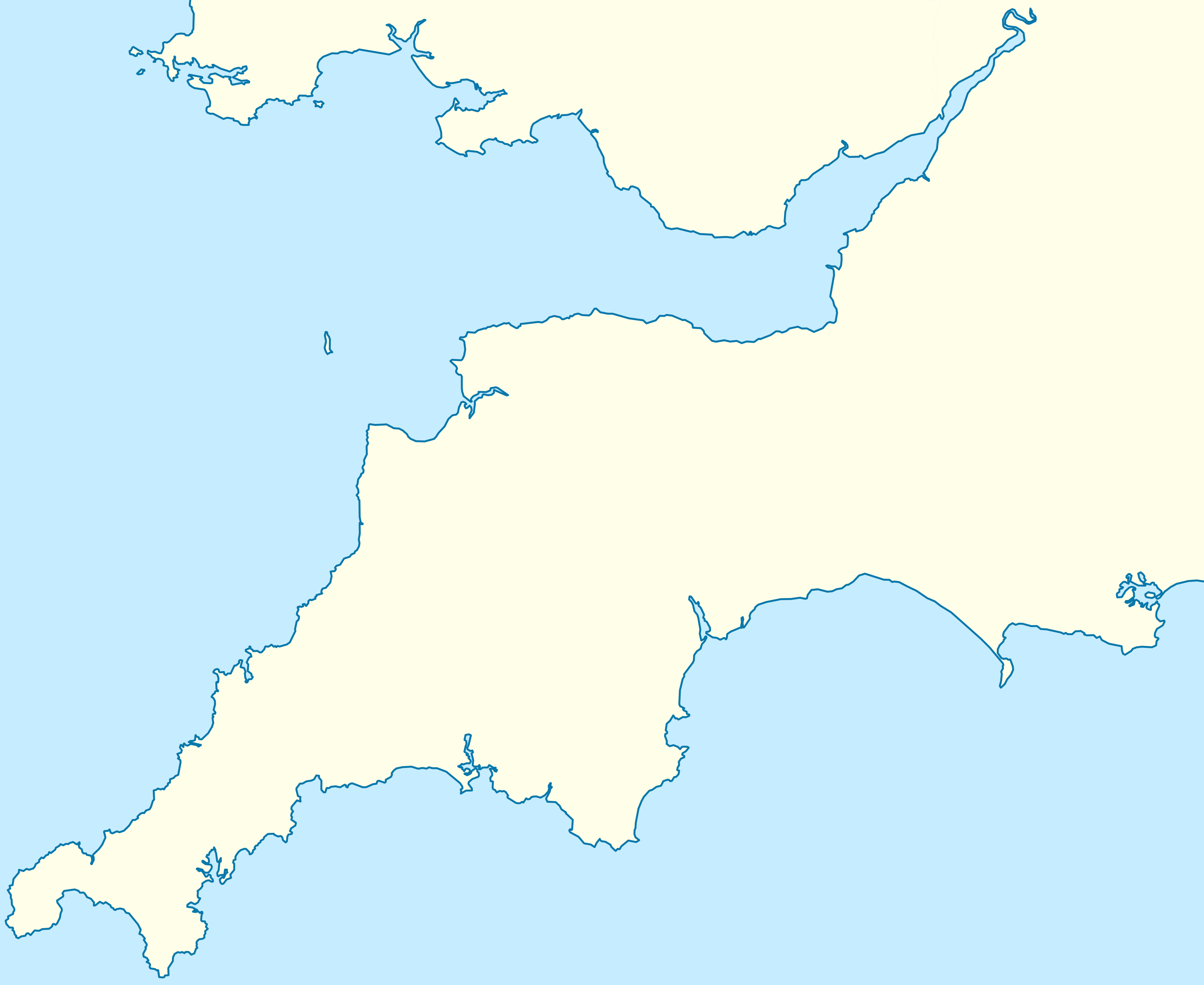
Locations of the teams playing in the South West Baseball League in 2017

North Conference

Teams	W	L	Pct.	RF	RA
Bristol Badgers	8	1	.889	165	35
Bristol Bats	6	3	.667	114	76
Taunton Muskets	5	5	.500	117	107
Taunton Musketoons	1	9	.100	95	173

South Conference

Teams	W	L	Pct.	RF	RA
Exeter Spitfires	8	2	.800	160	35
Plymouth Mariners	8	2	.800	234	86
St Austell Claycutters	2	8	.200	136	271
Newton Brewers	1	9	.100	60	298

Season will consist of ten rounds from 7 May to 6 August.

=== Baseball Scotland ===
Teams	W	L	Pct.	RF	RA
Glasgow Comets	0	0	.000	0	0
Glasgow Galaxy	0	0	.000	0	0
Edinburgh Giants	0	0	.000	0	0
Edinburgh Diamond Devils	0	0	.000	0	0
Edinburgh Cannons	0	0	.000	0	0
Granite City Oilers	0	0	.000	0	0
