= 2018 British baseball season =

- League: British Baseball Federation; British Baseball League
- Sport: Baseball

Regular season

National Baseball Championship

BBF seasons
- ← 2017 2019 →

The 2018 season was the 89th season of competitive baseball in the United Kingdom.

The season began in April and ran until early September.

== British Baseball Federation leagues ==
=== National Baseball League ===
London Mets defeated Hertfordshire Falcons in the finals, two games to nil.

=== Single-A ===
==== South ====
===== Pool B =====
====== Table ======
Pos	Team	Pld	W	L	W%	F	A	Pts
1	Essex Archers	14	11	3	79%			22
2	Tonbridge Wildcats	14	10	4	71%			20
3	Forest Glade Redbacks	14	9	5	64%			18
4	Brighton Jets	14	6	8	43%			12
5	Kent Bucs	14	3	11	21%			6
6	Kent Mariners	14	3	11	21%			6

== British Baseball League ==
The British Baseball League is unaffiliated to the British Baseball Federation.

=== Northern Baseball League ===
==== NBL AAA ====
===== Table =====
Pos	Team	Pld	W	L	W%	F	A	Pts
1	Cartmel Valley Lions	22	21	1	95%	233	48	42
2	Liverpool Trojans	28	21	7	75%	249	126	42
3	Nottingham Rebels	28	14	14	50%	202	186	28
4	Hull Scorpions	22	11	11	50%	142	161	22
5	Bolton Robots of Doom	26	5	21	19%	128	225	10

==== NBL AA ====
===== Table =====
Pos	Team	Pld	W	L	W%	F	A	Pts
1	Manchester A's	24	16	8	67%	229	131	32
2	County Durham Spartans	22	11	11	50%	175	169	22
3	Harrogate Tigers	26	9	17	35%	120	201	18
4	Sheffield Bladerunners	30	5	25	17%	165	405	10

==== NBL A ====
===== Table =====
Pos	Team	Pld	W	L	W%	F	A	Pts
1	Sheffield Bruins	24	19	5	79%	296	113	38
2	Liverpool Twojans	24	15	9	63%	274	194	30
3	Scorpions 2	22	13	9	59%	214	182	26
4	Manchester Torrent	22	0	22	0%	103	389	0
