= British baseball (disambiguation) =

British baseball is a traditional version of baseball played in Great Britain, specifically Wales, and areas of England, such as Merseyside.

British baseball may also refer to:

- Baseball in the United Kingdom, the version of baseball as originating in the United States played in the United Kingdom
- British Baseball Federation, governing body of the US-originating sport in the United Kingdom

== See also ==
- Great Britain national baseball team
- Great Britain women's national baseball team
- Rounders, a similar game from England once called "Base-Ball"
