= National Baseball League =

Amateur baseball league in the United Kingdom

- Current season, competition or edition: 2026 British baseball season
- Sport: Baseball
- No. of teams: 104
- Country: United Kingdom
- Most recent champion: London Mets (2025)
- Most titles: London Mets

The National Baseball League (NBL) is an amateur baseball league organised by the British Baseball Federation (BBF). The league is the top level of baseball in the United Kingdom, with the league champions also being named the overall National Champion in the United Kingdom. There is no official system of Promotion-and-Relegation; however several teams have moved up and down the structure freely.

== Teams ==
The NBL has fluctuated in size, with multiple teams joining and subsequently leaving. The BBF also allows multiple teams to come from the same club, as evident with the London Mets and Capitals both drawing from the same pool of players (although there are restrictions on players from a club playing with multiple teams in the same season).

2026 teams
| Team | Location | Ballpark |
|---|---|---|
| Croydon Pirates | Croydon | Roundshaw Playing Fields |
| Essex Arrows | Waltham Abbey, Essex | Townmead Playing Fields |
| Herts Toucans | Hemel Hempstead, Hertfordshire | Grovehill Ballpark |
| Leicester Blue Sox | Leicester, Leicestershire | N/A |
| Liverpool Trojans | Liverpool, Merseyside | N/A |
| Long Eaton | Long Eaton, Derbyshire | N/A |
| London Mets | Haringey, London | Finsbury Park |
| Manchester A’s | Wythenshawe, Greater Manchester | Wythenshawe Park |
| Sheffield Bruins | Sheffield, South Yorkshire | Thorpe Green Park |

Location of the 2024 National Baseball League Teams

== 2026 league system ==
UK baseball is not a professional sport, so the league structure changes every season. In 2026, the format will be the following:

| Level | National Baseball League | | | | | | |
| Division 1; 9 teams | North; 5 teams | | | South; 4 teams | | | |
| Division 2; 9 teams | East; 4 teams | | | West; 5 teams | | | |
| Division 3; 25 teams | North; 7 teams | | Central; 5 teams | South; 8 teams | | South West and Wales (SWWBL); 5 teams | |
| Division 4; 32 teams | North; 6 teams | Central; 4 teams | East; 5 teams | London; 5 teams | South; 5 teams | SWWBL; 7 teams | |
| Division 5; 26 teams | - | Central; 5 teams | East; 4 teams | Upper Canal; 3 teams | South; 5 teams | SWWBL; Severn; 5 teams | SWWBL; Wessex; 4 teams |
| Development | - | | | Lower Canal; 3 teams | - | | |
