= 2023 British baseball season =

2023 was the 94th season of competitive baseball in the United Kingdom.

This season saw the National Baseball League contract from 7 teams to 6, with BC Vetra and both Legends clubs (London and Lancashire) leaving, being replaced by the Herts Falcons (who last competed in 2021) and the East London Latin Boys.

Three previously independent leagues, the British Baseball League (Featuring teams from the North West of England), the East of England Baseball League (Representing teams from the East Midlands and East of England) and the North East Baseball League all affiliated themselves with the BBF, being added to the pyramid.

The BBF season had its opening day on 16 April, with the NBL season ending on 13 August. The Playoffs were held at the Farnham Park National Baseball & Softball Complex in Buckinghamshire, with the Single-Game Semi-Finals happening on 20 August, and the Final (reverting to a Best-of-3 series for the first time since 2018) being held across 26 and 27 August. The London Mets won the NBL Final, besting the Capitals 2-1 across the 3 game series.

== National Baseball League ==
Location of the 2023 National Baseball League Teams

=== Teams ===
Team	Location
East London Latin Boys	Waltham Forest, London
Essex Arrows	Waltham Abbey, Essex
Herts Falcons	Hemel Hempstead, Hertfordshire
London Capitals	Haringey, London
London Mets	Haringey, London
Sheffield Bruins	Sheffield, South Yorkshire

=== Standings ===
Pos	Team	Pld	W	L	Win%	GB	Qualification
1	London Mets	25	22	3	0.880	–	Qualify for Playoffs
2	Essex Arrows	25	20	5	0.800	2	Qualify for Playoffs
3	London Capitals	22	13	9	0.591	7.5	Qualify for Playoffs
4	Sheffield Bruins	19	7	12	0.368	12	Qualify for Playoffs
5	Herts Falcons	23	4	19	0.174	17	
6	East London Latin Boys	22	2	20	0.091	18.5	

Source: BBF

Correct as of 13/08/23

=== Playoffs ===
Semi Finals; 20 August
1	London Mets	11
4	Sheffield Bruins	0
2	Essex Arrows	5
3	London Capitals	7

NBL National Championship; 26-27 August
1	London Mets	3	5	14
3	London Capitals	5	0	0

== British Baseball Federation and Affiliated Leagues ==
=== Triple A Level ===
==== BBF AAA ====
===== Teams =====
Location of the 2023 BBF Triple A Teams

Teams	Location
Bournemouth Bears	Ferndown, Dorset
Bristol Badgers	Keynsham, Somerset
Croydon Pirates	Sutton, London
Herts Cardinals	Hemel Hempstead, Hertfordshire
Kent Buccaneers	Hadlow, Kent
London Metros	Haringey, London
Essex Redbacks	Chelmsford, Essex
Richmond Knights	Richmond upon Thames, London

===== Standings =====
Pos	Team	Pld	W	L	Win%	GB	Qualification
1	Bournemouth Bears	25	19	6	0.760	–	Qualification to Playoffs
2	Richmond Knights	26	19	7	0.731	0.5	Qualification to Playoffs
3	London Metros	25	17	8	0.680	2	Qualification to Playoffs
4	Herts Cardinals	25	13	12	0.520	6	Qualification to Playoffs
5	Bristol Badgers	28	12	16	0.429	8.5	
6	Croydon Pirates	27	11	16	0.407	9	
7	Essex Redbacks	27	10	17	0.370	10	
8	Kent Buccaneers	25	3	22	0.120	16	

Source: BBF

==== Playoffs ====
Semi Finals; 10 September
1	Bournemouth Bears	9
4	Herts Cardinals	5
2	London Metros	9
3	Richmond Knights	6

AAA Championship; 17 September
1	Bournemouth Bears	9
2	London Metros	7

==== BBL - Higher ====
===== Teams =====
Teams	Location
Liverpool Trojans Army	Sefton, Merseyside
Liverpool Trojans Navy	Sefton, Merseyside
Manchester As	Wythenshawe, Greater Manchester
Manchester Bees	Wythenshawe, Greater Manchester
Sheffield Kodiaks	Sheffield, South Yorkshire

===== Standings =====
Pos	Team	Pld	W	L	Win%	GB	Qualification
1	Liverpool Trojans Navy	22	19	3	0.864	–	Advance to Final
2	Liverpool Trojans Army	22	17	5	0.773	2	Advance to Wild Card
3	Manchester A's	22	12	10	0.545	7	Advance to Wild Card
4	Sheffield Kodiaks	20	5	15	0.250	14	
5	Manchester Bees	22	1	21	0.045	18	

Source: BBF

Correct as of 20/08/23

==== Playoffs ====
Wild Card; 2 September			BBL Higher Championship; 2-3 September
			1	Liverpool Trojans Navy	10	9	6
2	Liverpool Trojans Army	8	2	Liverpool Trojans Army	13	6	5
3	Manchester A's	3

=== Double A Level ===
==== BBF AA ====
===== Central & East =====
====== Teams ======
Teams	Location
Cambridge Lancers	Cambridge, Cambridgeshire
Essex Archers	Waltham Abbey, Essex
Herts Hawks	Hemel Hempstead, Hertfordshire
Milton Keynes Bucks	Milton Keynes, Buckinghamshire
Norwich Iceni	Norwich, Norfolk

====== Standings ======
Pos	Team	Pld	W	L	Win%	GB	Qualification
1	Cambridge Lancers	19	15	4	0.789	–	Advance to Playoffs
2	Norwich Iceni	19	15	4	0.789	0	
3	Milton Keynes Bucks	17	10	7	0.588	4	
4	Essex Archers	20	7	13	0.350	8.5	
5	Herts Hawks	21	1	20	0.048	15	

===== South =====
====== Teams ======
Teams	Location
East London Latin Boys	Waltham Forest, London
Formosa Islanders	Old Oak Common, London
Herts Ducks	Hemel Hempstead, Hertfordshire
London Musketeers	Haringey, London
London Meteors	Haringey, London
London Sidewinders	Haringey, London

====== Standings ======
Pos	Team	Pld	W	L	T	Win%	GB	Qualification
1	London Sidewinders	25	20	5	0	0.800	–	Advance to Playoffs
2	East London Latin Boys	25	19	6	0	0.760	1	
3	London Musketeers	25	14	11	0	0.560	6	
4	London Meteors	25	13	11	1	0.540	6.5	
5	Formosa Islanders	23	5	17	1	0.239	12	
6	Herts Ducks	23	1	22	0	0.043	17.5	

===== South & South West =====
====== Teams ======
Teams	Location
Bracknell Inferno	Bracknell, Berkshire
Bristol Bats	Keynsham, Somerset
Guildford Mavericks	Guildford, Surrey
Oxford Kings	Oxford, Oxfordshire
Richmond Dragons	Richmond upon Thames, London

====== Standings ======
Pos	Team	Pld	W	L	T	Win%	GB	Qualification
1	Richmond Dragons	20	15	5	0	0.750	–	Advance to Playoffs
2	Bracknell Inferno	19	12	7	0	0.632	2.5	
3	Guildford Mavericks	18	8	10	0	0.444	6	
4	Bristol Bats	17	7	9	1	0.441	6	
5	Oxford Kings	18	3	14	1	0.194	10.5	

===== South East =====
====== Teams ======
Teams	Location
Brighton Brewers	Brighton and Hove, East Sussex
Croydon Pirates	Sutton, London
Hurricanes Baseball	Hadlow, Kent
Kent Mariners	Rochester, Kent
Tonbridge Wildcats	Tonbridge, Kent

====== Standings ======
Pos	Team	Pld	W	L	Win%	GB	Qualification
1	Hurricanes Baseball	18	15	3	0.833	–	Advance to Playoffs
2	Brighton Brewers	19	15	4	0.789	0.5	
3	Tonbridge Wildcats	19	7	12	0.368	8.5	
4	Kent Mariners	15	5	10	0.333	8.5	
5	Croydon Pirates	17	2	15	0.118	12.5	

===== Playoffs =====
Semi Finals; 10 September
S	London Sidewinders	17
C&E	Norwich Iceni	2
SE	Hurricanes	16
S&SW	Richmond Dragons	13

AA Championship; 17 September
S	London Sidewinders	8
SE	Hurricanes	10

=== Single A Level ===
==== BBF Single A ====
===== Playoffs =====
Wild Card; 9 September
SCB	Herts Ravens	18
EEBL	Cambridge Royals	1

Semi Finals; 10 September
SWWBL	Cardiff Merlins I	12
SCB	Herts Ravens	2
SE	Tonbridge Bobcats	2
SCA	London Mustangs	13

A Championship; 17 September
SWWBL	Cardiff Merlins I	10
SCA	London Mustangs	0

== Summer Cup ==
On the weekend of 22 and 23 July, the BBF hosted the inaugural Summer Cup, a 2-day Tournament run from Farnham Park. 24 teams from 22 clubs took part, with a variety of teams makeups, including representative teams from Baseball Scotland, Baseball Ireland, the South West and Wales Baseball League, and the East of England Baseball league, plus teams from non-BBF Clubs, such as the Long Eaton Storm, Stockton Grizzlies, and BC Vetra.

Initially, the 3 tiers (Gold, for AAA and NBL-level teams, Silver, for AA and high independent-level teams, and Bronze, for A and low independent-level teams) were split into groups of 4, each of which would play a round-robin, with positional playoffs. However, due to inclement weather over the weekend, this format was instead changed to a single-elimination knockout, with losing teams moving into a lower bracket to decide positions.

=== Teams ===
Gold	Silver	Bronze
Baseball Ireland	Bracknell Inferno	Croydon Pirates
Baseball Scotland	Bristol Bats	Fire Breathing Kittens
BC Vetra	Bournemouth Bears	Guilford BC
Croydon Pirates	Formosa Islanders	Kent Mariners
Essex BC	Long Eaton Storm	London Mets
Liverpool Trojans	Norwich Iceni	New Forest Thunder Knights
London Mets	Newcastle Nighthawks	South West & Wales League
Sheffield Bruins	University of Nottingham	Stockton Grizzlies

=== Gold Bracket ===
==== Main Bracket ====
Quarter-finals
London Mets	7
BC Vetra	1
Croydon Pirates	15
Baseball Ireland	0
Liverpool Trojans	6
Baseball Scotland	7
Essex BC	11
Sheffield Bruins	1

Semi-finals
London Mets	3
Croydon Pirates	1
Baseball Scotland	3
Essex BC	5

Final
London Mets	3
Essex BC	2
Third Place Play-Off
Baseball Scotland	13
Croydon Pirates	2

==== Consolation Bracket ====
Consolation Semi-Finals
BC Vetra	4
Baseball Ireland	3
Liverpool Trojans	8
Sheffield Bruins	5

5th Place Play-Off
BC Vetra	2
Liverpool Trojans	6
7th Place Playoff
Baseball Ireland	15
Sheffield Bruins	1

=== Silver Bracket ===
==== Main Bracket ====
Quarter-finals
Bournemouth Bears	3
Bracknell Inferno	6
Norwich Iceni	12
U of Nottingham	2
Newcastle Nighthawks	1
Long Eaton Storm	2
Bristol Bats	w/o
Formosa Islanders

Semi-finals
Bracknell Inferno	7
Norwich Iceni	8
Long Eaton Storm	12
Bristol Bats	1

Final
Norwich Iceni	3
Long Eaton Storm	6
Third Place Play-Off
Bracknell Inferno	w/o
Bristol Bats

==== Consolation Bracket ====
Consolation Semi-Finals
Bournemouth Bears	7
U of Nottingham	4
Newcastle Nighthawks	w/o
Formosa Islanders

5th Place Play-Off
Bournemouth Bears	2
Newcastle Nighthawks	9
7th Place Playoff
U of Nottingham	w/o
Formosa Islanders

=== Bronze Bracket ===
==== Main Bracket ====
Quarter-finals
Croydon Pirates	7
London Mets	8
New Forest Thunder Knights	3
Stockton Grizzlies	11
Guildford BC	7
Fire Breathing Kittens	12
Kent Mariners	6
SWWBL	24

Semi-finals
London Mets	13
Stockton Grizzlies	6
Fire Breathing Kittens	8
SWWBL	13

Final
London Mets	8
SWWBL	7
Third place play-off
Stockton Grizzlies	9
Fire Breathing Kittens	17

==== Consolation Bracket ====
Consolation Semi-Finals
Croydon Pirates
New Forest Thunder Knights	w/o
Guildford BC	6
Kent Mariners	7

5th Place Play-Off
New Forest Thunder Knights	12
Kent Mariners	13
7th Place Playoff
Croydon Pirates
Guildford BC	w/o
