= 2024 British baseball season =

2024 is the 95th season of competitive baseball in the United Kingdom.

This season saw the National Baseball League remain at six teams, however, the Herts Falcons and East London Latin Boys were replaced by BC Vetra (who last appeared in the NBL in 2022) and the Bournemouth Bears.

The BBF season was have its opening day on 7 April, with two series at the Farnham Park National Baseball & Softball Complex. However, due to rain, the event was cancelled, with the Capitals/Bears series postponed and the Mets/Bruins series moved to the Enfield Playing Fields.

== National Baseball League ==
=== Teams ===
Location of the 2024 National Baseball League Teams

Teams	Location
Bournemouth Bears	Ferndown, Dorset
Essex Arrows	Waltham Abbey, Essex
London Capitals	Haringey, London
London Mets	Haringey, London
Sheffield Bruins	Sheffield, South Yorkshire
BC Vetra	Saltford, Somerset

=== Standings ===
Rank	Team	G	W	L	T	Pct.	GB	Home	Road
1	Essex Arrows	23	17	6	0	.739	—	7–2–0	2–1–0
2	London Mets	23	16	7	0	.696	1	8–3–0	2–3–0
3	London Capitals	23	13	10	0	.565	4	6–0–0	2–5–0
4	Sheffield Bruins	25	12	13	0	.480	6	2–5–0	6–5–0
5	BC Vetra	25	9	16	0	.360	9	5–4–0	3–7–0
6	Bournemouth Bears	23	4	19	0	.174	13	2–5–0	2–9–0

Statistics are correct as of September 16, 2024.

== British Baseball Federation and affiliated leagues ==
=== Triple A Level ===
==== BBF AAA ====
===== Teams =====
Location of the 2024 BBF Triple A Teams
Red: South West; Blue: A

Division	Team	Location
A	Cambridge Lancers	Cambridge, Cambridgeshire
A	Croydon Pirates	Sutton, London
A	East London Latino Hurricanes	Walthamstow, London
A	Essex Saxons	Chelmsford, Essex
A	Herts Cardinals	Hemel Hempstead, Hertfordshire
A	London Metros	Haringey, London
A	Richmond Roebucks	Richmond upon Thames, London
South West	Bracknell Inferno	Bracknell, Berkshire
South West	Bristol Badgers	Keynsham, Somerset
South West	Cardiff Merlins	Cardiff, Glamorgan
South West	New Forest Thunder	Brockenhurst, Hampshire

===== Standings =====
====== A Division ======
Rank	Team	G	W	L	T	Pct.	GB	Home	Road
1	Croydon Pirates	18	16	2	0	.889	—	9–1–0	7–1–0
2	London Metros	14	10	4	0	.714	4	4–2–0	6–2–0
3	Herts Cardinals	22	13	9	0	.591	5	7–3–0	6–6–0
4	Essex Saxons	16	8	8	0	.500	7	3–5–0	5–3–0
5	Richmond Roebucks	18	8	10	0	.444	8	3–7–0	5–3–0
6	Cambridge Lancers	18	4	14	0	.222	12	4–6–0	0–8–0
7	East London Latino Hurricanes	18	3	15	0	.167	13	2–6–0	1–9–0

====== South West Division ======
Rank	Team	G	W	L	T	Pct.	GB	Home	Road
1	Bracknell Inferno	19	16	3	0	.842	—	8–1–0	8–2–0
2	Bristol Badgers	22	13	9	0	.591	4.5	10–2–0	3–7–0
3	Cardif Merlins	21	7	14	0	.333	10	5–6–0	2–8–0
4	New Forest Thunder	22	6	16	0	.273	11.5	5–5–0	1–11–0

Statistics are correct as of July 28, 2024.

==== BBL - Higher ====
===== Teams =====
Location of the 2024 BBL Higher Teams

Team	Location
Liverpool Trojans	Bootle, Merseyside
Long Eaton Storm	Long Eaton, Derbyshire
Manchester As	Wythenshawe, Greater Manchester
Sheffield Kodiaks	Sheffield, South Yorkshire

===== Standings =====
Rank	Team	G	W	L	T	Pct.	GB	Home	Road
1	Liverpool Trojans	16	12	4	0	.750	—	5–1–0	7–3–0
2	Long Eaton Storm	16	11	5	0	.688	1	8–2–0	3–2–0
3	Manchester A's	16	5	11	0	.313	7	1–7–0	4–5–0
4	Sheffield Kodiaks	16	4	12	0	.250	8	2–6–0	2–6–0

Statistics are correct as of July 28, 2024.

=== Double A Level ===
==== Teams ====
Location of the 2024 BBF Double A Teams

Division	Team	Location
Central & East	Essex Archers	Waltham Abbey, Essex
Central & East	Herts Ducks	Barnet, London
Central & East	Herts Hawks	Hemel Hempstead, Hertfordshire
Central & East	Milton Keynes Bucks	Milton Keynes, Buckinghamshire
Central & East	Norwich Iceni	Norwich, Norfolk
South	Formosa Islanders	Hammersmith & Fulham, London
South	London Mustangs	Haringey, London
South	London Meteors	Haringey, London
South	London Sidewinders	Haringey, London
South	Richmond Dragons	Richmond upon Thames, London
South	Richmond Knights	Richmond upon Thames, London
South East	Brighton Aces	Brighton and Hove, East Sussex
South East	Brighton Brewers	Brighton and Hove, East Sussex
South East	Kent Buccaneers	Hadlow, Kent
South East	Tonbridge Wildcats	Tonbridge, Kent
South & South West	Bournemouth Bears (2)	Ferndown, Dorset
South & South West	Bristol Bats	Keynsham, Somerset
South & South West	Guildford Mavericks	Guildford, Surrey
South & South West	Oxford Kings	Oxford, Oxfordshire

==== BBL - Lower ====
===== Teams =====
Team	Location
Bootle Trojans	Bootle, Merseyside
Halton Trojans	Runcorn, Cheshire
Hull Scorpions	Hull, East Riding of Yorkshire
Leeds Locos	Otley, West Yorkshire
Manchester Bees	Wythenshawe, Greater Manchester
Sheffield Bladerunners I	Sheffield, South Yorkshire
Sheffield Bladerunners II	Sheffield, South Yorkshire
Wragby Warhammers	Wragby, Lincolnshire

===== Standings =====
Rank	Team	G	W	L	T	Pct.	GB	Home	Road
1	Wragby Warhammers	24	19	5	0	.792	—		
2	Bootle Trojans	22	14	8	2	.636	4		
3	Hull Scorpions	22	14	8	2	.636	4		
4	Leeds Locos	24	15	9	0	.625	4		
5	Sheffield Bladerunners II	18	10	8	6	.556	6		
6	Manchester Bee's	22	9	13	2	.409	9		
7	Sheffield Bladerunners I	20	7	13	4	.350	10		
8	Halton Trojans	24	0	24	0	.000	19		

=== Single A Level ===
==== BBF Single A ====
===== Teams =====
Location of the 2024 BBF Single A Teams
Blue: B; Yellow: C
Note: Teams primary fields will be used
Location of the 2024 BBF Single A Teams in Greater London
Red: A; Blue: B;
Note 1: Teams primary fields will be used
Note 2: Ravens are in Division A and Eagles are in Division B

Division	Team	Location
A	Croydon Pirates (2)	Sutton, London
A	Herts Eagles	Barnet, London
A	London Minotaurs	Haringey, London
A	London Mercury	Haringey, London
A	Richmond Barons	Richmond, London
A	Richmond Dukes	Richmond, London
B	Brentwood Stags	Brentwood, Essex
B	Essex Redbacks	Billericay, Essex/Waltham Abbey, Essex
B	Herts Buzzards	Hemel Hempstead, Hertfordshire
B	Herts Ravens	Barnet, London/Hemel Hempstead, Hertfordshire
B	Milton Keynes Bucks (2)	Milton Keynes, Buckinghamshire
C	Brighton Jets	Brighton and Hove, East Sussex
C	Bracknell Phoenix	Bracknell, Berkshire
C	Guildford Millers	Guildford, Surrey
C	Hurricanes Baseball	Hildenborough, Kent
C	Kent Mariners	Rochester, Kent
C	Hastings Pirates	St Leonards-on-Sea, East Sussex
C	Tonbridge Bobcats	Tonbridge, Kent

===== Standings =====
====== A Division ======
Rank	Team	G	W	L	T	Pct.	GB	Home	Road
1	London Minotaurs	28	22	6	0	.786	—	0–0–0	0–0–0
2	Croydon Pirates A	28	20	8	0	.714	2	0–0–0	0–0–0
3	London Mercury	27	18	9	0	.667	3.5	0–0–0	0–0–0
4	Richmond Barons	26	13	13	0	.500	8	0–0–0	0–0–0
5	Herts Eagles	27	6	21	0	.222	15.5	0–0–0	0–0–0
6	Richmond Dukes	30	4	26	0	.133	19	0–0–0	0–0–0

====== B Division ======
Rank	Team	G	W	L	T	Pct.	GB	Home	Road
1	Herts Ravens	18	15	3	0	.833	—	0–0–0	0–0–0
2	Milton Keynes Bucks 2	18	14	4	0	.778	1	0–0–0	0–0–0
3	Essex Redbacks	18	4	14	0	.222	11	0–0–0	0–0–0
4	Herts Buzzards	18	3	15	0	.167	12	0–0–0	0–0–0

====== C Division ======
Rank	Team	G	W	L	T	Pct.	GB	Home	Road
1	Bracknell Phoenix	24	18	6	0	.750	—	0–0–0	0–0–0
1	Guildford Millers	24	18	6	0	.750	—	0–0–0	0–0–0
3	Hurricanes Baseball 2	24	15	9	0	.625	3	0–0–0	0–0–0
4	Tonbridge Bobcats	22	13	9	0	.591	4	0–0–0	0–0–0
5	Kent Mariners	24	9	15	0	.375	9	0–0–0	0–0–0
6	Brighton Jets	24	5	19	0	.208	13	0–0–0	0–0–0
6	Hastings Pirates	22	4	18	0	.182	13	0–0–0	0–0–0

==== South West and Wales Baseball League ====
Location of the 2024 SWWBL Teams
Red: Severn; Blue: Wessex

===== Teams =====
Division	Team	Location
Severn	Bournemouth Bears (3)	Ferndown, Dorset
Severn	Bristol Buccaneers	Keynsham, Somerset
Severn	Bristol Brunels	Keynsham, Somerset
Severn	Cardiff Merlins (2)	Cardiff, Glamorgan
Severn	New Forest Knights	New Milton, Hampshire
Wessex	Cornish Claycutters	Carnon Downs, Cornwall
Wessex	Cornish Pioneers	Carnon Downs, Cornwall
Wessex	Taunton Muskets	Taunton, Somerset
Wessex	Taunton Pistols	Taunton, Somerset
Wessex	Weston Jets	Weston-super-Mare, Somerset

===== Standings =====
====== SWWBL Severn ======
Rank	Team	G	W	L	T	Pct.	GB	Home	Road
1	Bristol Buccaneers	26	19	7	0	.731	—	0–0–0	0–0–0
2	Cardiff Merlins A	26	18	8	0	.692	1	0–0–0	0–0–0
3	Bristol Brunels	26	10	16	0	.385	9	0–0–0	0–0–0
4	New Forest Knights	26	8	18	0	.308	11	0–0–0	0–0–0
5	Bournemouth Bears 3	26	1	25	0	.038	18	0–0–0	0–0–0

====== SWWBL Wessex ======
Rank	Team	G	W	L	T	Pct.	GB	Home	Road
1	Cornish Claycutters	26	22	4	0	.846	—	0–0–0	0–0–0
2	Weston Jets	26	21	5	0	.808	1	0–0–0	0–0–0
3	Taunton Muskets	26	20	6	0	.769	2	0–0–0	0–0–0
4	Taunton Pistols	26	6	20	0	.231	16	0–0–0	0–0–0
5	Cornish Pioneers	26	5	21	0	.192	17	0–0–0	0–0–0

== Women's Baseball League ==
=== Teams ===
Location of the 2024 Women's Baseball League Teams

Teams	Location
Belles Baseball	N/A
Leicester Diamonds	Leicester, Leicestershire
London Mayhem	Haringey, London
Manchester Jetts	Wythenshawe, Greater Manchester
Norwich Iceni Queens	Norwich, Norfolk
SWWBL Serpents	N/A
Sheffield Bruins	Sheffield, South Yorkshire
Telford 26ers	Coalbrookdale, Shropshire

=== Standings ===
Rank	Team	G	W	L	T	Pct.	GB
1	Manchester Jetts	8	7	1	0	.875	—
1	Sheffield Bruins	6	6	0	0	1.000	—
3	Belles Baseball	7	4	3	0	.571	2.5
4	London Mayhem	6	3	3	0	.500	3
5	SWWBL Serpents	7	2	5	0	.286	4.5
6	Leicester Diamonds	8	2	6	0	.250	5
7	Norwich Iceni Queens	6	0	6	0	.000	6

Statistics are correct as of August 26th, 2024.

== Independent leagues ==
=== Westcountry Baseball League ===
==== Teams ====
Location of the 2024 WBL Teams

Teams	Location
Exeter Spitfires	Clyst St Mary, Devon
Newton Brewers	Teigngrace, Devon
Plymouth Mariners	Plymouth, Devon
Truro Blue Jays	Truro, Cornwall
Wellington Khaki Sox	Wellington, Somerset
Yeovil Whirlwinds	Bradford Abbas, Dorset

=== Standings ===
Rank	Team	G	W	L	T	Pct.	GB	Home	Road
1	Exeter Spitfires	15	13	2	0	.867	—	0–0–0	0–0–0
2	Wellington Khaki Sox	15	11	4	0	.733	2	0–0–0	0–0–0
3	Plymouth Mariners	13	8	5	0	.615	4	0–0–0	0–0–0
4	Newton Brewers	14	4	10	0	.286	8.5	0–0–0	0–0–0
5	Truro Blue Jays	14	4	10	0	.286	8.5	0–0–0	0–0–0
6	Yeovil Whirlwinds	13	2	11	0	.154	10	0–0–0	0–0–0

Statistics are correct as of August 26, 2024.

=== West Midlands Baseball League ===
==== Teams ====
Location of the 2024 WMBL Teams
Red: South West; Blue: East
Note: Metalheads are in the East Division and Bats are in the West Division

Division	Teams	Location
East	Birmingham Metalheads	Marston Green, Birmingham
East	Leicester Blue Sox	Leicester, Leicestershire
East	Long Eaton Storm Chasers	Long Eaton, Derbyshire
East	Stockton Grizzlies	Stockton, Warwickshire
West	Birmingham Bats	Marston Green, Birmingham
West	Stourbridge Titans	Halesowen, West Midlands
West	Telford Giants	Coalbrookdale, Shropshire
West	Wolverhampton Wolves	Wolverhampton, West Midlands
West	Worcester Sorcerers	Littleworth, Worcestershire

===== Standings =====
====== East Division ======
Rank	Team	G	W	L	T	Pct.	GB	Home	Road
1	Birmingham Metalheads	5	5	0	0	1.000	—	4–0–0	1–0–0
2	Stockton Grizzlies	7	5	2	0	.714	1	2–1–0	3–1–0
3	Leicester Blue Sox	5	3	2	0	.600	2	2–1–0	1–1–0
4	Long Eaton Storm Chasers	6	2	4	0	.333	3	2–0–0	0–4–0

====== West Division ======
Rank	Team	G	W	L	T	Pct.	GB	Home	Road
1	Worcester Sorcerers	7	5	2	0	.714	—	2–1–0	3–1–0
2	Wolverhampton Wolves	8	5	3	0	.625	0.5	2–2–0	3–1–0
3	Telford Giants	7	3	4	0	.429	2	3–2–0	0–2–0
4	Stourbridge Titans	6	1	5	0	–	3.5	0–4–0	1–1–0
5	Birmingham Bats	7	0	7	0	–	5	0–2–0	0–5–0

Statistics are correct as of July 28, 2024.
