= Baseball in the United Kingdom =

- Country: United Kingdom
- Governing body: British Baseball Federation
- National teams: Men's national team Women's national team
- First played: 1874

National competitions
- British Baseball Federation National League, AAA, AA and A divisions

Baseball is a growing minor sport in the United Kingdom, with an estimated 22,500 people playing in 2020.

The sport is governed by the British Baseball Federation, which runs a multi-tier national league. There are also independent regional leagues, and around 20 universities field teams. At various times in history, there have been professional teams, most notably the 1890 National League of Baseball of Great Britain.

In 1938, the Great Britain national baseball team won the Baseball World Cup, and were runners-up in the 1967 and 2007 European Baseball Championship. As of 2020, Great Britain competed internationally at under 12, under 15, under 18, under 23 and senior levels. The under 23 team placed fifth at the 2019 European Under 23 Baseball Championship.

Despite relatively low numbers of participants today, historically there have been a number of players born in the United Kingdom who have played in U.S. Major League Baseball (MLB). Over 90 British-born players have played in MLB, Danny Cox, Lance Painter and Bobby Thomson being the most notable. Thomson hit the Shot Heard 'Round the World that took the New York Giants to the World Series in 1951.

== Major League Baseball players born in the United Kingdom ==
Over 90 players born in the four constituent nations of the United Kingdom and pre partition Ireland have played professionally in Major League Baseball. That does not include players born outside the United Kingdom but of British heritage, or players who have played in MLB and represented the Great Britain national baseball team, but who were born outside the United Kingdom.

== Inductees to the National Baseball Hall of Fame and Museum ==
Henry Chadwick, born in Exeter, was a sportswriter, baseball statistician and historian, often referred to as the "Father of Baseball", for his early reporting on and contribution to the development of the game. He edited the first baseball guide to be sold to the public. He is credited with creating box scores, as well as the scoring abbreviation "K" that designates a strikeout. He is also said to have created the statistics of batting average and earned run average (ERA).

Tom Connolly, born in Manchester, was an umpire in Major League Baseball. He officiated in the National League from 1898 to 1900, followed by 31 years of service in the American League from 1901 to 1931. In over half a century as an American League umpire and supervisor, he established the high standards for which the circuit's arbiters became known, and solidified the reputation for integrity of umpires in the major leagues.

Harry Wright, born in Sheffield, was described by fellow Hall of Fame inductee Henry Chadwick as "the father of professional base ball". Although not born in the United Kingdom, George Wright is another inductee of United Kingdom heritage. George is the brother of Harry, and his parents were born in England.

== Major League Baseball players who have represented the United Kingdom ==
Either through being born in the United Kingdom, via ancestral links to the United Kingdom, or qualifying via being born in a Commonwealth member nation, a number of players with MLB experience have represented the United Kingdom internationally, via the Great Britain national baseball team. The most notable recent player is Jazz Chisholm Jr.

== History ==
=== Origins ===
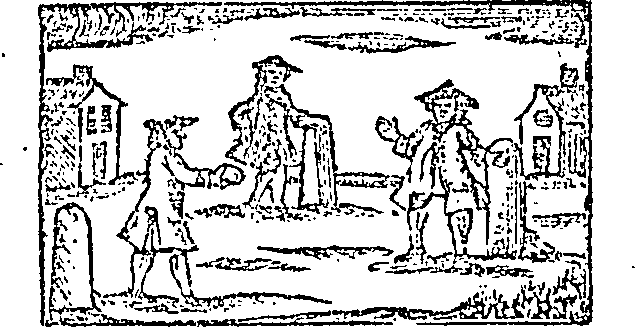
Baseball as depicted in A Little Pretty Pocket-Book, which may have involved hitting with the hand

It is argued that modern American baseball can trace its roots to 18th century Britain, with the earliest known mention and illustration of the game appearing in John Newbery's A Little Pretty Pocket-Book in 1744. The earliest known rules were printed in 1796, in Germany, as "Das Englische Base-ball".

Although early codes of baseball may have originated in the United Kingdom, the American code of baseball, as North Americans would understand it, started to be played in the UK as early as the 1870s and it was fully developed by 1890, when the professional 1890 National League of Baseball of Great Britain was established. Since the 1870s, many exhibition matches between North American teams have been staged in the United Kingdom, culminating in the MLB London Series in 2019, which sold out 120,000 tickets in less than an hour. As a result, a small number of MLB teams have fan clubs in the United Kingdom.

=== American influence in the 19th century ===
In the 1870s, baseball teams from the United States, including the Boston Red Stockings and Philadelphia Athletics, toured the United Kingdom, in an effort to popularise the sport, but with limited success. At that time, John Wisden and Co. were the most famous supplier of essential baseball equipment, "as used by the baseball clubs now in England in all their matches", which shows that organised clubs did exist in England in some form as early as the 1870s. Wisden remains a prominent name in international cricket today.

In 1888, the President of St. Louis, on returning to the United States from their European tour, remarked that "England is now educated up to American sports", and encouraged other American baseball club presidents to continue promoting the game in England. Later in 1888, John Barnes, of the Western League St. Paul club, discussed his plans to travel to England to establish a "baseball syndicate" in London, Birmingham and other large cities.

In 1889, the wealthy Albert Goodwill Spalding used his position as a former star player and as a leading sporting goods supplier to arrange yet another tour of the United Kingdom by American baseball stars, including the Chicago White Stockings, building on the earlier tours in the past decades. As with previous tours, the cricket establishment of England was used to promote baseball, with the Prince of Wales one of the "very large number of spectators" to witness the game at the Oval, and over 8,000 attended a game at Lord's cricket ground. On arriving at Bristol, Spalding paid tribute to the English cricket star W. G. Grace, "the best known Englishman in the world".

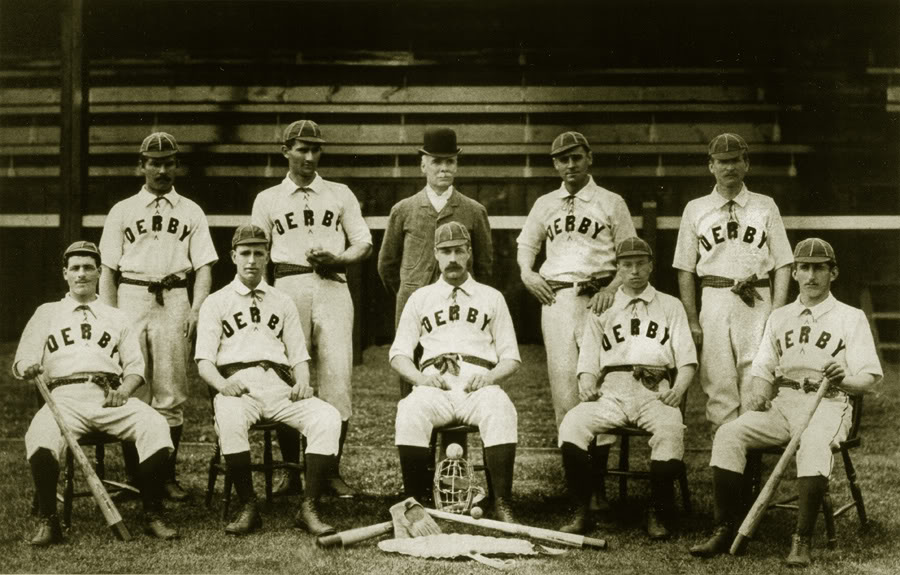
Derby Baseball Club were one of Britain's leading baseball teams in the 1890s

That tour led to a number of new baseball clubs springing up, such as York Baseball Club, formed at Stotts Refreshment Rooms in Parliament Street as early as March 1889. The most notable of the new clubs was formed 1890, in Derby, as Ley's Recreation Club, by Francis Ley, a local man who had experienced the game on a trip to the United States. Following their first ever game (as Ley's Recreation Club) Ley began to appeal for "professionals aged 20 to 25" and "cricketers who can field smartly" to attend Ley's Recreation Centre to form a club, in March 1890 and Ley's Recreation Club became Derby Baseball Club. Despite evidence showing clubs such as York were formed slightly earlier than or at the same time as Derby, when discussing Derby in 1890, Ley erroneously claimed "we were really the first club formed in Great Britain".

Ley, who certainly had "introduced baseball amongst his employees" and was instrumental in providing superb facilities at Derby, was not in attendance in October 1889, when noted supporters of a new National League of Baseball of Great Britain met at the Criterion, London, to formally establish the new baseball association, though he was elected as a provisional officer. Representatives of Preston North End, Gloucester County Cricket Club, Essex County Cricket Club, Staffordshire County Cricket Club, Aston Villa and the National Rounders Association all were represented and elected as officers to the association, with Newton Crane elected to the chair.

The new association quickly moved to establish a headquarters at 38 Holborn Viaduct, London, from where it would agree on and promote a set of rules by which the new National League would be played. By July 1890, it was estimated that there were over 90 baseball clubs in England alone, with Derby Baseball Club being widely believed to be the best professional club in England. Yorkshire proved to be a surprising hotbed of baseball by 1890, when it was reported that "there are more baseball clubs in Yorkshire than in any other county in England." It was not totally unexpected when the Secretary of Essex County Cricket Club, Morton Peto Betts, resigned his position to take up the role of Secretary of the newly formed Baseball Association of Great Britain, in July 1890.

Aston Villa, now known exclusively as a football club, won the only professional baseball championship in 1890. The competition was hindered by poor weather and disappointing crowds, and made a loss for its investors. Aston Villa's win was not without controversy, however, with both Aston Villa and Preston North End being found guilty of cheating during the season. For much of the season Derby Baseball Club did lead the championship, but pressure from other teams in the league over the number of American players on the Derby team, as well as low attendances, led to Derby being expelled before the end of the season although, despite evidence to the contrary, the club insisted they had "retired" as champions.

In response to the accusations against Derby of employing too many talented American baseball players, Ley wrote letters to editors of newspapers to state "Derby Baseball Club is the only one of the four League clubs to have not imported professional players from America", and went to lengths to point out the lack of support Spalding provided to Derby compared to the other clubs in which he was a major shareholder. Ironically, given the finger pointing at Ley for employing too many Americans, of the various American baseball players sent across to coach and play baseball in England in the 1890 season, the most prominent was arguably Preston North End captain Leech Maskrey, who had played Major League Baseball. In August 1890, the Preston club organised a presentation for their captain, who was returning to the United States. Meanwhile, Spalding turned his attention to establishing collegiate baseball in the United Kingdom with very little success.

In March 1890, Edinburgh Northern Baseball Club began to meet for practice and Spalding's influence was obvious when The Spalding Baseball Club of Aberdeen sprang to life in July 1890, their headquarters being at 59 Princes Street. By August 1890, the financial backing of Spalding resulted in two local rivals emerging in Aberdeen, the Spalding Baseball Club and Aberdeen Baseball Club, who played at The Links. The two competed for the Spalding 50-guinea Challenge Cup and the right to take on the University Baseball Club of Edinburgh, evidence of Spalding's desire to establish collegiate baseball in the United Kingdom. Wales, possibly due to the continued popularity of British or Welsh Baseball, was slower to adopt the American game. In April 1893, Cardiff Central were formed, and claimed to organise "the first game of American baseball played in South Wales." They were based at Grangetown.

=== The Golden Age and Postwar Decline ===
By 1911, the game's growing popularity was of enough concern to tradition-minded elites that the London County Council banned it, deeming it "dangerous to spectators"; this did not stop the formation of women's baseball teams.

Baseball's peak popularity in Britain was in the years immediately preceding World War II. A resurgence of professional baseball occurred in parts of the United Kingdom during the 1930s, but the outbreak of war led to a decline. In that era, professional baseball teams often shared grounds with football and rugby league clubs, and drew crowds of up to 10,000 spectators per game. In 1933, in response to a challenge from Major League Baseball's National League President, John Haydler, the wealthy British gambling tycoon, Sir John Moores, established the National Baseball Association and continued to fund the establishment of amateur and professional leagues in England.

Once again, American and Canadian expatriates swelled the rosters of the semi-profesional clubs, with a number of the Canadian professionals going on to represent the Great Britain national team. During this golden age, UK baseball achieved a major milestone in 1938, with the victory of the Great Britain national baseball team over the United States, in the Baseball World Cup. The series was created by Sir John Moores, with the 1939 Amateur World Series competition initially being named the John Moores Cup.

With the backing of Sir John Moores, a Great Britain team was given financial support to compete in the 1939 series, in Havana, as defending champions. In doing so, they would have become the first national representative team to compete outside the United Kingdom, but the outbreak of the World War II interrupted the development of British baseball. The team withdrew from the competition, and the sport entered into decline. Following the War, in July 1951, Wolsley Athletic (Birmingham) became the first baseball team from the United Kingdom to play in continental Europe, in an official game in Belgium.

== At present ==
In 2021, 90 teams from 48 baseball clubs were actively participating in leagues, and 1,500 adult and junior (under 18) players playing in clubs based across a wide geographic area of the island of Great Britain. Despite being a constituent nation of the United Kingdom, domestic baseball in Northern Ireland is affiliated to Baseball Ireland, for practical reasons. Northern Ireland's only team, the Belfast Northstars, play in the Irish Adult League. Despite that quirk, Northern Irish-born players, such as P.J. Conlon, are able to qualify to play for both Ireland and the United Kingdom internationally.

The British Baseball Federation (BBF) is the governing body for baseball in the UK and the baseball leagues. The season runs from April until August. Affiliated baseball clubs pay an annual affiliation fee to be a member of the BBF and play in the BBF Leagues and Junior Leagues. There are three leagues independent of the British Baseball Federation: the Scottish National League, run by Baseball Scotland, the Northern Baseball League containing mainly teams based in Northern England, and the South West and Wales Baseball League, representing some of the teams in the South West of England, as well as one team in Wales. There is also a full Great Britain Baseball Programme which comprises the Great Britain Baseball Academy, junior national teams and Great Britain 'Seniors' Baseball Team.

The BBF league format is divided into the national divisions, consisting of four tiers from the National League, down to the Single-A league. At the end of the season, all divisions compete in post-season tournaments, in which the top teams from each conference play knock-out matches, with the winning teams then progressing to the Championship Series. The Championship Series of the National League is best of three, whereas the AAA, AA and A championships are single games.

The Independent leagues compete against the teams in their own leagues and, in 2017, the first Independent leagues finals weekend was held at Hull, which consisted of semi-finals between the champions of the Independent leagues and a final held the next day. That was followed by an England v Scotland friendly All-Star game.

== Baseball in universities ==
University baseball in the United Kingdom has also been growing, with 75 teams from 35 universities currently participating in the sport. The university season runs from September to May, typically the off-season for baseball. Between 2013 and 2019, the National Champion was decided by the BaseballSoftballUK (BSUK)-run National University Championship, which was run as a bi-annual event. In 2020, the sport was admitted into the British Universities and Colleges Sport (BUCS) system, with a new national championship being held at the Farnham Park National Baseball & Softball Complex. Initially, it was supposed to take place in 2021, but the season was suspended due to the COVID-19 pandemic, delaying the launch of the new National Championship until the 2021–22 season

In 2023, the University of Central Lancashire made UK baseball history by offering two students, Aflie Hill and Nathan Simmons, scholarships to play baseball. As far as is known, it was the first time that had happened in the UK.

=== List of National Champions ===
==== National University Championships (BSUK) ====
Season	Winners	Comments
2014 (March)	University of East Anglia	
2014 (October)	University of East Anglia	
2015 (March)	Loughbrough University	
2015 (October)	Loughbrough University	
2016 (March)	Loughbrough University	
2016 (October)	Durham University	
2017 (March)	University College London	
2017 (October)	Loughbrough University	
2018 (March)	Postponed	
2018 (June)	Durham University	
2018 (October)	Loughbrough University	Known as the Autumn Open University Challenge
2019 (March)	Loughbrough University	

==== BUCS National Championships ====
Season	Winners	Score	Runners-up	Comments
2021-22	Loughborough University	7-4	University of East Anglia	
2022-23	Loughborough University	5-3	University of Central Lancashire	, Semi-Finals and Finals postponed to 3 May due to weather
2023-24	Durham University	13-2	University of Southampton	
2024-25	Durham University	21-1	University of East Anglia	
2025-26	University of Oxford	22-5	University of Cambridge	

== National Baseball Champions ==
Season	Winners	Score	Runners-up	Comments
1890	Aston Villa		Preston North End Baseball Club	No playoff
1892	Middlesbrough	25–16	St. Thomas's	
1893	Thespian London	33–6	Darlington St. Augustine's	
1894	Thespian London	38–14	Stockton-on-Tees	
1895	Derby Baseball Club	20–16	Fullers	
1896	Wallsend-On-Tyne	16–10	Remingtons	
1897	Derby Baseball Club	30–7	Middlesbrough	
1899	Derby Baseball Club	14–3	Nottingham Forest	
1900	Nottingham Forest	17–16	Derby Baseball Club	
1906	Tottenham Hotspur	16-5	Nondescripts	
1907	Clapton Orient	8–7	Fulham	
1908	Tottenham Hotspur	6–5	Leyton	
1909	Clapton Orient	6–4	Leyton	
1910	Brentford	20–5	West Ham United	
1911	Leyton	6–5	Crystal Palace	
1934	Hatfield	13–12	Albion	
1935	New London	7–1	Rochdale Greys	
1936	White City	9–5	Catford Saints	
1937	Hull	5–1	Romford Wasps	
1938	Rochdale Greys	1–0	Oldham Greyhounds	15 innings
1939	Halifax	9–5	Rochdale Greys	
1948	Liverpool Robins	13–0	Thames Board Mills	
1949	Hornsey Red Sox	10–5	Liverpool Cubs	
1950	Burtonwood Bees	23–2	Hornsey Red Sox	
1951	Burtonwood Bees	9–2	Ruislip Rockets	
1959	Thames Board Mills	12–4	East Hull Aces	
1960	Thames Board Mills	6–1	Liverpool Tigers	
1962	Liverpool Tigers	8–3	East Hull Aces	
1963	East Hull Aces	8–3	Garringtons	
1965	Kingston Aces	4–2	Stretford Saints	
1966	Stretford Saints	3–1	Liverpool Aces	
1967	Liverpool Yankees	4–2	Beckenham Bluejays	
1968	Hull Aces	4–1	Hull Royals	
1969	Watford-Sun Rockets	8–7	Liverpool Trojans	11 innings
1970	Hull Royals	3–1	Hull Aces	
1971	Liverpool Tigers	8–3	Hull Aces	
1972	Hull Aces	6–4	Hull Royals	
1973	Burtonwood Yanks	23–3	Hull Aces	
1974	Nottingham Lions	5–3	Hull Royals	
1975	Liverpool Tigers	5–3	Nottingham Lions	
1976	Liverpool Trojans	5–4	Spirit Of '76	
1977	Golders Green Sox	9–5	Hull Aces	
1978	Liverpool Trojans	14–12	Crawley Giants	
1979	Golders Green Sox	9–7	Hull Aces	
1980	Liverpool Trojans	12–1	Hull Aces	
1981	London Warriors	23–1	Hull Aces	
1982	London Warriors	16–7	Liverpool Trojans	
1983	Cobham Yankees	10–3	Hull Mets	
1984	Croydon Blue Jays	9–8	Hull Mets	
1985	Hull Mets	10–8	London Warriors	
1986	Cobham Yankees	12–5	Hull Mets	
1987	Cobham Yankees	6–0	Southglade Hornets	
1988	Cobham Yankees	16–1	Burtonwood Braves	
1989	Enfield Spartans	15–9	Sutton Braves	
1990	Enfield Spartans	22–3	Hull Mets	
1991	Enfield Spartans	9–7, 2–4, 4–1	London Athletics	Spartans won 2 games to 1
1992 BBF	Leeds City Royals		Humberside Mets	Awarded championship by walkover
1992 NL	London Warriors	23–0, 5–4	Enfield Spartans	Warriors won 2 games to 0
1993 BBF	Humberside Mets and Chicksands Indians			Title decider not played
1993 NL	London Warriors	2–1	Enfield Spartans	
1994 BBF	Humberside Mets	2–3, 10–0, 8–0	Essex Arrows	Mets won 2 games to 1
1994 NL	Enfield Spartans	8–5	Waltham Forest Angels	
1995	Menwith Hill Pirates	3–2, 7–6	London Warriors	Pirates won 2 games to 0
1996	Menwith Hill Pirates	14–9, 11–23, 18–12	London Warriors	Pirates won 2 games to 1
1997	London Warriors	11–5, 31–12	Kingston-upon-Hull Cobras	Warriors won 2 games to 0
1998	Menwith Hill Patriots	13–5, 17–15	London Warriors	Patriots won 2 games to 0
1999	Brighton Buccaneers	16–4	Windsor Bears	
2000	London Warriors	11–7	Brighton Buccaneers	
2001	Brighton Buccaneers	8–5	Windsor Bears	
2002	Brighton Buccaneers	5–1	Windsor Bears	
2003	Windsor Bears	9–4	Brighton Buccaneers	
2004	Croydon Pirates	12–10	Windsor Bears	
2005	Croydon Pirates	11–4, 10–9	Brighton Buccaneers	Pirates won 2 games to 0
2006	Richmond Flames	7–11, 8–5, 9–0	Croydon Pirates	Flames won 2 games to 1
2007	London Mets	7–2, 11–1	Croydon Pirates	Mets won 2 games to 0
2008	London Mets	11–4	Richmond Flames	
2009	Bracknell Blazers	16–4	Richmond Flames	
2010	Richmond Flames	10–1	Bracknell Blazers	
2011	Harlow Nationals	13–3	Lakenheath Diamondbacks	
2012	Harlow Nationals	6–3	Herts Falcons	
2013	Southern Nationals	12–7	Southampton Mustangs	
2014	Essex Arrows	5–1, 5–4	London Mets	Arrows won 2 games to 0
2015	London Mets	6–2, 11–2	Southampton Mustangs	Mets won 2 games to 0
2016	Southampton Mustangs	0–1, 7–3, 9–4	London Mets	Mustangs won 2 games to 1
2017	London Mets	15–14, 6–0	Southampton Mustangs	Mets won 2 games to 0
2018	London Mets	16–1, 11–1	Herts Falcons	Mets won 2 games to 0
2019	London Mets	14–4	London Capitals	
2020	London Mets	9–1	London Capitals	
2021	London Mets	8-5	London Capitals	
2022	London Mets	9–4	London Capitals	
2023	London Mets	3-5, 5–0, 14–0	London Capitals	Mets won 2 games to 1
2024	London Mets	12-2, 7–4	Essex Arrows	Mets won 2 games to 0
2025	London Mets	5-4, 14–2	Herts Toucans	Mets won 2 games to 0

=== Championships by Region ===
Region	Number of championships	Towns/Cities
London	37	London (37)
North West	14	Liverpool (9), Warrington (3), Rochdale (1), Stretford (1)
Yorkshire and the Humber	14	Hull (9), Harrogate (3), Halifax (1), Leeds (1)
South East	10	Cobham (4), Brighton (3), Bracknell (1), Southampton (1), Windsor (1)
East of England	7	Harlow (2), Purfleet (2), Bedford (1), Waltham Abbey (1), Watford (1)
East Midlands	5	Derby (3), Nottingham (2)
North East	2	Middlesbrough (1), Newcastle (1)
West Midlands	1	Birmingham (1)
Scotland	–	
South West	–	
Wales	–	

== 2026 league system ==
UK baseball is not a professional sport, so the league structure changes every season. In 2026, the format will be the following:

Level	National Baseball League						
Division 1; 9 teams	North; 5 teams			South; 4 teams			
Division 2; 9 teams	East; 4 teams			West; 5 teams			
Division 3; 25 teams	North; 7 teams		Central; 5 teams	South; 8 teams		South West and Wales (SWWBL); 5 teams	
Division 4; 32 teams	North; 6 teams	Central; 4 teams	East; 5 teams	London; 5 teams	South; 5 teams	SWWBL; 7 teams	
Division 5; 26 teams	-	Central; 5 teams	East; 4 teams	Upper Canal; 3 teams	South; 5 teams	SWWBL; Severn; 5 teams	SWWBL; Wessex; 4 teams
Development				Lower Canal; 3 teams			
	Independent Leagues						
1	Kernow Baseball League		Scottish National League; AAA		West Midlands Baseball League		
2			Scottish National League; A				

== 2026 Clubs ==
Note: This list does not contain clubs which failed to opt in to the 2026 league system and are officially listed as inactive. Youth teams are also not included.

Club	Team Name	City/Area	Ballpark	League	Tier	Club Founded
BC Vėtra	BC Vėtra	Saltford, Somerset	Saltford Sports Club	BBF - Division 2 West	2	2018
Birmingham BC	Birmingham Metalheads	Birmingham, West Midlands	Marston Green Recreational Ground	BBF - Division 2 West	2	2003
Birmingham BC	Birmingham Bats	Birmingham, West Midlands	Marston Green Recreational Ground	BBF - Division 4 Central	4	2003
Bognor BC	Bognor Cobras	Bognor Regis, West Sussex	King George V Recreation Ground	BBF - Division 4 South	4	2024
Bournemouth Bears BC	Bournemouth Bears	Ferndown, Dorset	Ferndown Leisure Centre	BBF - Division 3 SWWBL	3	2018
Bracknell B&SC	Bracknell Inferno	Bracknell, Berkshire	Westmoreland Drive	BBF - Division 2 West	2	1992
Bracknell B&SC	Bracknell Phoenix	Bracknell, Berkshire	Westmoreland Drive	BBF - Division 4 South	4	1992
Bracknell B&SC	Bracknell Pyros	Bracknell, Berkshire	Westmoreland Drive	BBF - Division 5 Central	5	1992
Brighton BC	Brighton Brewers	Brighton and Hove, East Sussex	Waterhall Playing Fields	BBF - Division 2 East	2	2016
Brighton BC	Brighton Aces	Brighton and Hove, East Sussex	Waterhall Playing Fields	BBF - Division 4 South	4	2016
Brighton BC	Brighton Jets	Brighton and Hove, East Sussex	Waterhall Playing Fields	BBF - Divison 5 South	5	2016
Bristol BC	Bristol Badgers	Keynsham, Somerset	Somerdale Pavilion	BBF - Division 2 West	2	2008
Bristol BC	Bristol Bats	Keynsham, Somerset	Somerdale Pavilion	BBF - Division 3 SWWBL	3	2008
Bristol BC	Bristol Buccaneers	Keynsham, Somerset	Somerdale Pavilion	BBF - Division 4 SWWBL	4	2008
Bristol BC	Bristol Brunels	Keynsham, Somerset	Somerdale Pavilion	BBF - Division 5 SWWBL Severn	5	2008
Cambridge Baseball	Cambridge Sovereigns	Cambridge, Cambridgeshire	Dave Adams Field	BBF - Division 3 Central	3	2011
Cambridge Baseball	Cambridge Royals	Cambridge, Cambridgeshire	Dave Adams Field	BBF - Division 4 East	4	2011
Cambridge Baseball	Cambridge Monarchs	Cambridge, Cambridgeshire	Dave Adams Field	BBF - Division 5 East	5	2011
Cardiff Merlins Baseball	Cardiff Merlins 1	Cardiff, Cardiff	Pontcanna Fields	BBF - Division 3 SWWBL	3	2018
Cardiff Merlins Baseball	Cardiff Merlins 2	Cardiff, Cardiff	Pontcanna Fields	BBF - Division 4 SWWBL	4	2018
Cornish ClayCutters BC	Cornish ClayCutters	St. Austell, Cornwall	St Mewan School Field	BBF - Division 4 SWWBL	4	2017
Cornish ClayCutters BC	Cornish Pioneers	St. Austell, Cornwall	St Mewan School Field	BBF - Division 5 SWWBL Wessex	5	2017
County Durham Spartans BC	County Durham Spartans	Staindrop, County Durham	Staindrop Academy	BBF - Division 4 North	4	2017
Croydon Pirates Baseball	Croydon Pirates 1	Sutton, London	Roundshaw Grounds	BBF - NBL South	1	1981
Croydon Pirates Baseball	Croydon Pirates 2	Sutton, London	Roundshaw Grounds	BBF - Division 3 South	3	1981
Croydon Pirates Baseball	Croydon Pirates 3	Sutton, London	Roundshaw Grounds	BBF - Division 4 South	4	1981
Edinburgh Angels	Edinburgh Angels	Edinburgh, Edinburgh	Warriston Playing Fields	SNBL - AAA	S1	2024
Edinburgh BC	Edinburgh Diamond Devils	Edinburgh, Edinburgh	Bobby Thomson Field	SNBL - AAA	S1	1985
Edinburgh BC	Edinburgh Cannons	Edinburgh, Edinburgh	Bobby Thomson Field	SNBL – AAA	S1	1985
Edinburgh Rays BC	Edinburgh Rays	Edinburgh, Edinburgh	Morgan Playing Fields	SNBL - AAA	S1	2023
Essex Baseball	Essex Arrows	Waltham Abbey, Essex and Chelmsford, Essex	Townmead Leisure Park and Melbourne Park	BBF - NBL South	1	1983
Essex Baseball	Essex Saxons	Waltham Abbey, Essex and Chelmsford, Essex	Townmead Leisure Park and Melbourne Park	BBF - Division 2 East	2	1983
Essex Baseball	Essex Archers	Waltham Abbey, Essex and Chelmsford, Essex	Townmead Leisure Park and Melbourne Park	BBF - Division 3 Central	3	1983
Essex Baseball	Essex Seaxes	Waltham Abbey, Essex and Chelmsford, Essex	Townmead Leisure Park and Melbourne Park	BBF - Division 4 East	4	1983
Essex Baseball	Essex Redbacks	Waltham Abbey, Essex and Chelmsford, Essex	Townmead Leisure Park and Melbourne Park	BBF - Division 5 East	5	1983
Exeter Baseball Club	Exeter Spitfires	Exeter, Devon	Chadwick Field	BBF - Division 3 SWWBL	3	2000
Exeter Baseball Club	Exeter Wyverns	Exeter, Devon	Chadwick Field	BBF - Division 5 SWWBL Wessex	5	2000
Glasgow Baseball Association	Glasgow Baseball Association	Glasgow, Glasgow	Tolcross Field	SNBL – AAA	S1	1997
Glasgow Baseball Association	Glasgow Comets	Glasgow, Glasgow	Tolcross Field	SNBL – A	S2	1997
Glasgow Baseball Association	Glasgow Galaxy	Glasgow, Glasgow	Tolcross Field	SNBL – A	S2	1997
Glasgow Eclipse BC	Glasgow Eclipse	Glasgow, Glasgow	Tolcross Park	SNBL - A	4	2021
Guildford B&SC	Guildford Mavericks	Guildford, Surrey	Christ's College	BBF - Division 3 South	3	1992
Guildford B&SC	Guildford Millers	Guildford, Surrey	Christ's College	BBF - Division 5 Central	5	1992
Harwich Town BC	Harwich Town Bay Area Blues	Harwich, Essex	Low Road Field	BBF - Division 4 East	4	2021
Hastings Pirates BC	Hastings Pirates	Hastings, East Sussex	Bexhill Park	BBF - Division 5 South	5	2018
Herts Baseball	Herts Cardinals	Barnet, London	Basing Hill Park	BBF - NBL South	1	1996
Herts Baseball	Herts Cardinals	Barnet, London	Basing Hill Park	BBF - Division 2 East	2	1996
Herts Baseball	East London Latin Boys	Barnet, London	Basing Hill Park	BBF - Division 3 Central	3	1996
Herts Baseball	Herts Hawks	Barnet, London	Basing Hill Park	BBF - Division 4 London	4	1996
Herts Baseball	Herts Ravens	Barnet, London	Basing Hill Park	BBF - Division 4 London	4	1996
Herts Baseball	Herts Eagles	Barnet, London	Basing Hill Park	BBF - Division 5 Central	5	1996
Herts Baseball	Herts Raptors	Barnet, London	Basing Hill Park	BBF - Division 5 Central	5	1996
Hildenborough Hurricanes BC	Hildenborough Hurricanes	Waltham Forest, London	Salisbury Hall Playing Fields	BBF - Division 3 South	3	2023
Hildenborough Hurricanes BC	Hildenborough Hurricanes 2	Waltham Forest, London	Salisbury Hall Playing Fields	BBF - Division 5 South	5	2023
Hull Scorpions BC	Hull Scorpions	Hull, East Riding of Yorkshire	Eastmount Recreation Centre	BBF - Division 3 North	3	2008
Kent BC	Kent Bucs	Hadlow, Kent	Williams Field	BBF - AA - C	3	2018
Kent BC	Kent Mariners	Medway, Kent	Hoo Sports Field	BBF - Division 5 South	5	2018
Kernow Baseball CIC	Truro Blue Jays	Truro, Cornwall	Boscawen Park	Kernow Baseball League	R	2022
Kernow Baseball CIC	Falmouth Oyster Catchers	Falmouth, Cornwall	Mawnan Smith	Kernow Baseball League	R	2022
Kernow Baseball CIC	Roseland Rebels	Truro, Cornwall	-	Kernow Baseball League	R	2022
Kernow Baseball CIC	Carn Brea Dynamite	Redruth, Cornwall	Illogan Field	Kernow Baseball League	R	2022
Leeds Locos	Leeds Locos 1	Otley, West Yorkshire	Wharfemeadows Park	BBF - Division 3 North	3	2020
Leeds Locos	Leeds Locos 2	Otley, West Yorkshire	Wharfemeadows Park	BBF - Division 4 North	4	2020
Leicester Blue Sox	Leicester Blue Sox	Leicester, Leicestershire	Western Park	BBF - NBL North	1	2006
Leicester Blue Sox	Leicester 2Sox	Leicester, Leicestershire	Western Park	BBF - Division 4 Central	4	2006
London Mets B&SC	London Mets	Haringey, London and Enfield, London	Finsbury Park and Enfield Baseball Field	BBF - NBL South	1	1988
London Mets B&SC	London Metros	Haringey, London and Enfield, London	Finsbury Park and Enfield Baseball Field	BBF - Division 2 East	2	1988
London Mets B&SC	London Meteors	Haringey, London and Enfield, London	Finsbury Park and Enfield Baseball Field	BBF - Division 3 South	3	1988
London Mets B&SC	London Marauders	Haringey, London and Enfield, London	Finsbury Park and Enfield Baseball Field	BBF - Division 3 South	3	1988
London Mets B&SC	London Minotaurs	Haringey, London and Enfield, London	Finsbury Park and Enfield Baseball Field	BBF - Division 4 London	4	1988
London Mets B&SC	London Mercury	Haringey, London and Enfield, London	Finsbury Park and Enfield Baseball Field	BBF - Division 4 London	4	1988
London Mets B&SC	London Mastodons	Haringey, London and Enfield, London	Finsbury Park and Enfield Baseball Field	BBF - Division 5 Canal	5	1988
London Mets B&SC	London Mercernaries	Haringey, London and Enfield, London	Finsbury Park and Enfield Baseball Field	BBF - Division 5 Canal	5	1988
London Mets B&SC	London Mayhem	Haringey, London and Enfield, London	Finsbury Park and Enfield Baseball Field	BBF - Division 5 Canal	5	1988
London Mets B&SC	Hackney Regents	Haringey, London and Enfield, London	Finsbury Park and Enfield Baseball Field	BBF - Development Canal	6	1988
London Mets B&SC	Limehouse Cutters	Haringey, London and Enfield, London	Finsbury Park and Enfield Baseball Field	BBF - Development Canal	6	1988
London Mets B&SC	London Mutineers	Haringey, London and Enfield, London	Finsbury Park and Enfield Baseball Field	BBF - Development Canal	6	1988
Long Eaton Storm	Long Eaton Storm	Long Eaton, Derbyshire	West Park Leisure Centre	BBF - NBL North	1	2014
Manchester BC	Manchester As	Wythenshawe, Greater Manchester	Wythenshawe Park	BBF - NBL North	1	1947
Manchester BC	Manchester Bees	Wythenshawe, Greater Manchester	Wythenshawe Park	BBF - Division 3 North	3	1947
Manchester BC	Manchester Cavaliers	Wythenshawe, Greater Manchester	Wythenshawe Park	BBF - Division 4 North	4	1947
Middlesex Capybaras	Middlesex Capybaras	Enfield, London	Enfield Playing Fields	BBF - Division 5 Central	5	2025
Milton Keynes BC	Milton Keynes Bucks	Milton Keynes, Buckinghamshire	Woughton on the Green	BBF - Division 3 Central	3	1986
Milton Keynes BC	Milton Keynes Bucks 2	Milton Keynes, Buckinghamshire	Woughton on the Green	BBF - Division 4 Central	4	1986
Newcastle BC	Newcastle Nighthawks	Newcastle upon Tyne, Tyne and Wear	Gosforth Sports Association	BBF - Division 3 North	3	2017
New Forest BC	New Forest Thunder	Eastleigh, Hampshire	Wide Lane Sports Ground	BBF - Division 5 SWWBL Severn	5	2022
New Forest BC	New Forest Knights	Eastleigh, Hampshire	Wide Lane Sports Ground	BBF - Division 5 SWWBL Severn	5	2022
Newton Abbot Brewers	Newton Abbot Brewers	Bishopsteignton, Devon	Michaels Field	BBF - Division 4 SWWBL	4	2015
Northants BC	Northants Centurions 1	Northampton, Northamptonshire	St Crispin Community Centre	BBF - Division 4 Central	4	2013
Northants BC	Northants Centurions 2	Northampton, Northamptonshire	St Crispin Community Centre	BBF - Division 5 East	5	2013
Norwich Iceni Baseball	Norwich Iceni Rebels	Norwich, Norfolk	The Hewett Academy	BBF - Division 4 East	4	2017
Norwich Iceni Baseball	Norwich Iceni Warriors	Norwich, Norfolk	The Hewett Academy	BBF - Division 4 East	4	2017
Oxford Kings BC	Oxford Kings	Oxford, Oxfordshire	Oxford Kings Ballpark	BBF - Division 3 Central	3	1998
Plymouth Mariners BC	Plymouth Mariners	Plymouth, Devon	Wilson Field	BBF - Division 5 SWWBL Wessex	5	2000
Plymouth Outlaws BC	Plymouth Outlaws	Plymouth, Devon	Wilson Field	BBF - Division 4 SWWBL	4	2025
Plymouth Outlaws BC	Plymouth Outlaws 2	Plymouth, Devon	Wilson Field	BBF - Division 5 SWWBL Wessex	5	2025
Redditch & Bromsgrove BC	Redditch Claykickers	Redditch, Worcestershire	Morton Stanley Park	WMBL	R	2024
Richmond B&SC	Richmond Roebucks	Richmond upon Thames, London	Flood Field	BBF - Division 2 West	2	1992
Richmond B&SC	Richmond Knights	Richmond upon Thames, London	Flood Field	BBF - Division 3 South	3	1992
Richmond B&SC	Richmond Dragons	Richmond upon Thames, London	Flood Field	BBF - Division 3 South	3	1992
Richmond B&SC	Richmond Barons	Richmond upon Thames, London	Flood Field	BBF - Division 4 London	4	1992
Richmond B&SC	Richmond Dukes	Richmond upon Thames, London	Flood Field	BBF - Division 5 Central	5	1992
Sheffield Bladerunners	Sheffield Bladerunners I	Sheffield, South Yorkshire	Forge Valley	BBF - Division 3 North	3	1985
Sheffield Bladerunners	Sheffield Bladerunners II	Sheffield, South Yorkshire	Forge Valley	BBF - Division 4 North	4	1985
Sheffield Bruins BC	Sheffield Bruins	Sheffield, South Yorkshire	Thorpe Green Park	BBF - NBL North	1	2018
Sheffield Bruins BC	Sheffield Kodiaks	Sheffield, South Yorkshire	Thorpe Green Park	BBF - Division 4 North	4	2018
Stockton BC	Stockton Grizzlies	Stockton, Warwickshire	The Den	WMBL	R	2022
Stourbridge Titans BC	Stourbridge Titans	Stourbridge, West Midlands	Gibson Field	WMBL	R	2011
Taunton Muskets BC	Taunton Muskets	Taunton, Somerset	Muskets Field	BBF - Division 3 SWWBL	3	2014
Taunton Muskets BC	Taunton Pistols	Taunton, Somerset	Muskets Field	BBF - Division 5 SWWBL Severn	5	2014
Tayport Breakers BC	Tayport Breakers	Tayport, Fife	Tom Waddell Memorial Baseball Field	SNBL - AAA	S1	2020
Tayport Breakers BC	Tayport Breakers A	Tayport, Fife	Tom Waddell Memorial Baseball Field	SNBL - A	S2	2020
Telford BC	Telford Giants	Telford, Shropshire	Meadow Recreation Ground	WMBL	R	2020
Tonbridge Baseball	Tonbridge Wildcats	Tonbridge, Kent	Borley Field	BBF - Division 4 South	4	1982
Tonbridge Baseball	Tonbridge Bobcats	Tonbridge, Kent	Borley Field	BBF - Division 5 South	5	1982
Torrington Riptides BC	Torrington Riptides	Torrington, Devon	Torrington Rugby Club	BBF - Division 5 SWWBL Wessex	5	2024
Trojans BC	Liverpool Trojans	Sefton, Merseyside and Runcorn, Cheshire	Norman Wells Ballpark and John Mills Ballpark	BBF NBL North	1	1946
Trojans BC	Bootle Trojans	Sefton, Merseyside and Runcorn, Cheshire	Norman Wells Ballpark and John Mills Ballpark	BBF - Division 3 North	3	1946
Trojans BC	Halton Trojans	Sefton, Merseyside and Runcorn, Cheshire	Norman Wells Ballpark and John Mills Ballpark	BBF - Division 4 North	4	1946
Wellington Khaki Sox BC	Wellington Khaki Sox	Wellington, Somerset	Wellington Rugby Club	BBF - Division 4 SWWBL	4	2021
Weston Jets BC	Weston Jets	Weston-Super-Mare, Somerset	Hutton Moor	BBF - Division 4 SWWBL	4	2018
Wolverhampton BC	Wolverhampton Wolves	Wolverhampton, West Midlands	Colton Hills Community School	WMBL	R	2019
Worcester BC	Worcester Sorcerers	Worcester, Worcestershire	Merlin Field	WMBL	R	2019
Wragby BC	Wragby Warhammers	Wragby, Lincolnshire	Hammer Park	BBF - Division 3 North	3	2021
Yeovil Whirlwinds BC	Yeovil Whirlwinds	Yeovil, Somerset	Bradford Abbas Sports Club	BBF - Division 5 SWWBL Severn	5	2018

== See also ==
- Baseball awards#United Kingdom
- Baseball awards#Europe
- English baseball
- Welsh baseball
