= Sheffield Bladerunners =

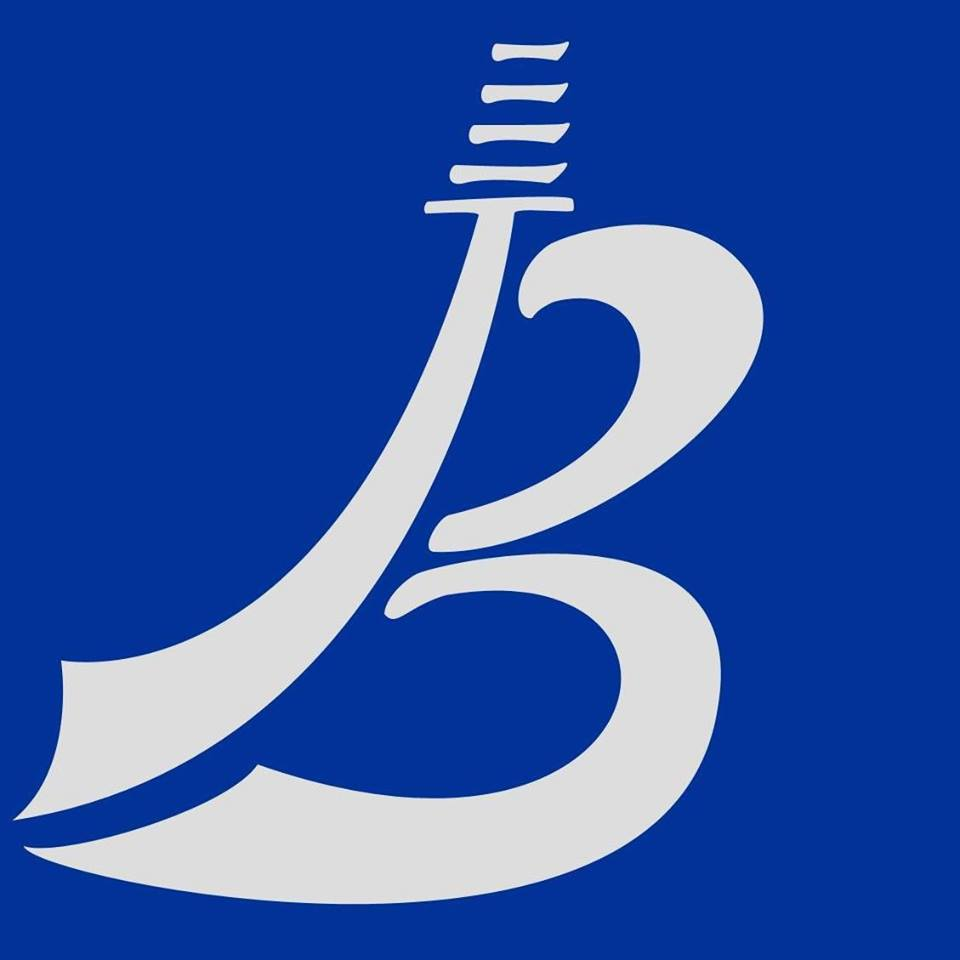
- Logo

Information
- League: BBF Division 3 North
- Location: Sheffield, England
- Ballpark: Forge Valley School
- Founded: 1985
- Nickname: Bladerunners
- 2024 Season: (I) 7-13 (II) 10-8
- Colors: Blue, White
- Retired numbers: 23, 28
- General manager: Thomas Spradling (United States)
- Manager: Nestor Martinez (Venezuela)
- Website: www.sheffieldbladerunners.co.uk

Current uniforms
Main Strip	Alternate Strip	Third Strip

The Sheffield Bladerunners are a baseball club based in Sheffield, England who currently compete with 3 teams, one in the competitive Division 3, one in Division 4 and one development team The Bladerunners were established in 1985 and their home ground is Forge Valley School, Sheffield.

The Bladerunners as of 2026 currently runs with three teams, the 1st team know simply as Team 1 are the competitive team currently playing in the 3rd division of the British Baseball pyramid, Team 2 play in the 4th Division and team 3 play in the 5th Division, team 2 and 3 act as development teams.

== Franchise history ==
=== Formation and early history (1985–2000) ===
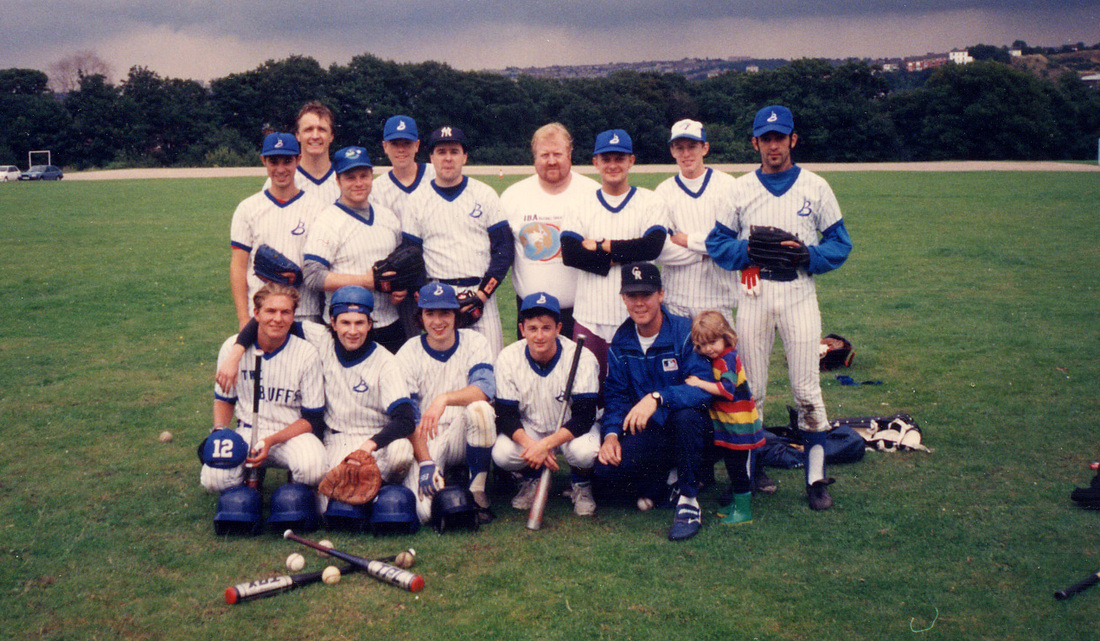
Sheffield Bladerunners in 1990

Founded in 1985, the Bladerunners, led by manager Steve Herbert (who would soon be the BBF president), played their home games at Rowlinson Sports Centre, hosting mainly Yorkshire teams such as the Leeds City Royals, the Huddersfield Heroes and the Harrogate Redwings. Their games were all recorded in the popular Sheffield newspaper Green Un.

Over the next 15 years, many changes happened in the club, including changes in location and players. During the 1990s, many big names in Northern baseball would join the Bladerunners, such as Frazer Longford (who would go on to have his number retired), Tommy Booth, and current-day manager Rich Green. The league continued to be full of Northern teams, even reaching as high as Edinburgh in the late 1990s. In 1995, when the Bladerunners were playing in the British Baseball Federation North Division 2, Steve Herbert decided to leave the managing side of the club and allowed Lee Vaughn and Frazer Longford to take over as a managing duo.

In 1998, Hinde House School underwent a major refit and left the team looking for a new field to call home. At around the same time, Jay ‘Flanders’ Stearns joined the club (another player who would have his number retired). Appointed as manager in the 1998 preseason, the first job was to secure a new ground. After evaluating many options the Bladerunners finally settled at Myrtle Springs School. 1998 was also the debut year of 'Beaver Bites', a club newsletter made by the Sheffield Bladerunners.

=== Early 2000s changes (2000–2005) ===
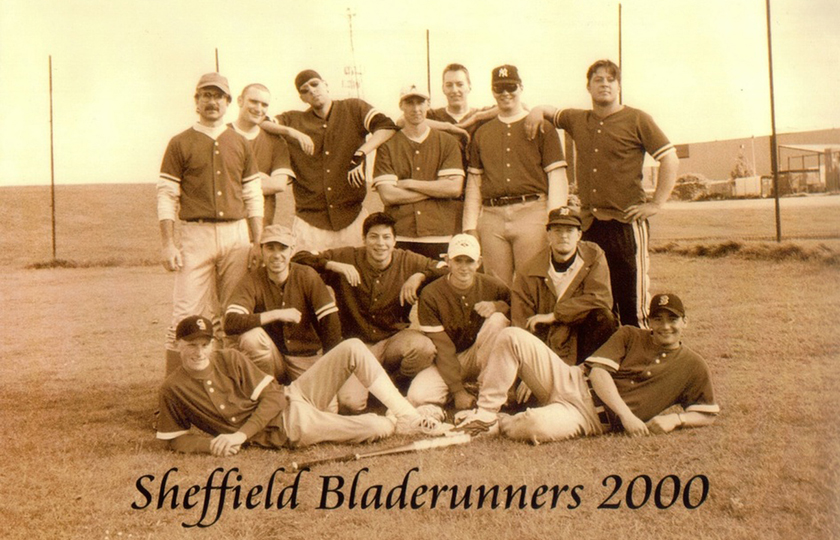
Sheffield Bladerunners in 2000

In the early 2000s, the team moved to the Phoenix Sports Club, the ground that the team would reside in for a number of years. This occurred around the time of the league's restructuring in 2000, splitting teams based on quality and location: placing the Bladerunners with Manchester B, Durham, Barnsley and the Yorkshire Puddings.

The 2004 season, remains to this day, the best performance by the Bladerunners, where they dominated the 8-team Division 1 North, winning every single game. Their 21–0 record carried them into the postseason, where they won the championship. 2005 brought Nick Wills to the team, an American who would soon be the manager.

=== Barnsley Strikers acquisition and merger (2006–2011) ===
In the 2006 offseason, the Sheffield Bladerunners merged with the Barnsley Strikers to form two teams, the Sheffield Bladerunners (AAA North) and the Sheffield Strikers (AA North). Following the merger, the 2007 season was a rebuilding year for both the Bladerunners and the Strikers. With the retirement of many veterans, the Strikers team became more of a youth side, completed by a few of the remaining ex-Barnsley players.

The Strikers struggled in the 2007 season, ending with a 1–18 record, and rejoined the Bladerunners, who in the 2008 season finished 5th in the league with a poor 6–18 record. The 2010 and 2011 seasons went far better for the Bladerunners however; in the latter, the team placed 2nd in the division with a record of 13–9, making the playoffs for the second straight season.

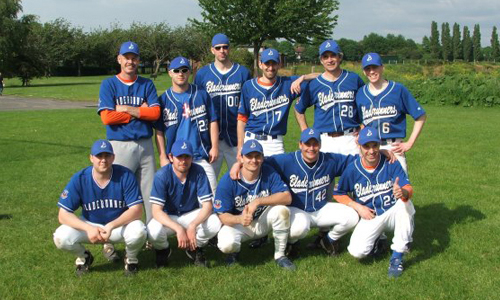
Sheffield Bladerunners in 2014

=== Stearns' departure and rebuilding (2012–2014) ===
In 2012, big changes happened to the club: Jay Stearns resigned as manager, and another ground change occurred, this time to Thorncliffe, which did not have a developed diamond, let alone a mound. Up until 2018, the Bladerunners have used a portable mound built by Stearns prior to his departure. Nick Wills took over as manager from Stearns and would remain in this position until Rich Green took over in 2016.

The 2014 season marked a period of growth and expansion for the Bladerunners, as the pre-season brought a substantial number of new players, both rookies and returning players. This season also featured an overhaul of the team's management and structure, with the introduction of new coaches, a media officer and a social events officer.

=== Modern day Bladerunners (2015–present) ===
In 2015, the team relocated once again to their current home: Forge Valley School, which boasts fantastic facilities and a baseball mound built by the team in 2018.

Following the split of Northern teams from the British Baseball Federation, the Bladerunners joined the newly formed British Baseball League's Northern Baseball League. They currently play in the BBL's Northern Baseball League under manager Rich Green.

2017 saw the launch of the Bladerunners Junior Programme, a youth system for Under-14s to get involved with baseball.

The Sheffield Bladerunners played at the AAA (2nd tier of baseball in the UK) in the 2017 and 2018 seasons with moderate success in the 2017 season making the northern playoffs finishing in third place having defeated the Manchester As in a third place playoff.

In 2018 the Bladerunners suffered from the split and formation of the Sheffield Bruins and struggled to a last place finish in the AAA level leading to a subsequent relegation the next season.

In 2019, the Bladerunners club were able to confirm that due to a growing player-base, there would be a second-team added to the Single-A division. These teams were split between veterans and rookies to help with development, and in the first season of this new change, Bladerunners I was able to secure a division title. Bladerunners II also made the playoffs. The plan had paid off and the team saw success on and off the diamond.

For the 2020 season, the club added a third team, and due to the reworked Northern Baseball League, the Single-A division was split into East, Central, and West. Therefore, with the splits taking place, the three Bladerunners teams were due to fill out the Central division. However, due to the COVID-19 pandemic, the 2020 season of the National Baseball League did not go ahead.

For the 2021 season of the Northern Baseball League, the club announced the intention to offer 4 teams into the Double-A and Single-A divisions.

The 2021 season, which would be the first full season since the 2020 season was cancelled due to the COVID-19 pandemic, proved to be a strong season for the Bladerunners.

The Bladerunners, now expanded to four teams with a large number of rookies performed well under their respective managers,

Team I was led by Nestor Martinez who proved to be a rock for team I, he pitched regularly and played his usual shortstop position with excellence and with some added power hitting.

Team II, III and IV played in the A division whilst team I played in the AA division.

Team I and IV ultimately qualified for the AA and A playoffs respectively with Team I eventually falling to the Newcastle Nighthawks in a hard-fought game eventually losing out 12–1.

Team IV however defeated rivals Sheffield Bruins development team the Cubs decisively to set up a final with the Halton Trojans a team within the Liverpool Trojans organisation and defeated them comfortably to claim the A playoff championship.

This victory allowed them to compete in the national A championship scheduled in late September, Team I played as the representative of the British Baseball League at the A level.

Going forward the bladerunners are hoping to repeat and build on the success in both A and AA in the 2022 season.

The 2022 season saw the continuation of the three team structure this was an ultimately disappointing season with no Bladerunners teams reaching the playoffs.

The 2023 season saw a reduction in the Bladerunners numbers with this resulting in a two team structure with one development team. Teams I and II played the season in the newly formed "Lower" division of the Northern Baseball league (equivalent to a AA/A level) now re-affiliated with the British Baseball Federation. Whilst Team I struggled throughout the season to maintain form finishing 9–11. Team II under American coach and Pitcher Thomas Spradling were able to keep pace with the League's best finishing tied for 3rd with a 12–10 record to reach the playoffs where they were ultimately defeated by the Wragby Warhammers in a close game with Leeds Locos taking the title in the final later that day defeating Wragby comfortably.

The 2024 season began with the same team structure as 2023 with the rosters for each team also remaining the same. In somewhat of a deja vu scenario team I again continued to struggle for form and for consistency in player attendance, this left them with a 7–13 record. Team II continued with the consistent play and were able to finish with a 10–8 record however this was only good enough for a 5th-place finish, with them being eliminated on the final day with a loss to the Bootle Trojans. Both teams suffered with a lack of players throughout the season which likely contributed to the overall performance of the teams.

The Bladerunners now look to build on the back of successful seasons moving into the 2025 season.

The Bladerunners had a successful 2025 season, with two teams playing at the AA level. Team I ultimately conquered the Northern Division of the British Baseball Federation and progressed to the playoffs where they were defeated by Guilford Mavericks in the quarter finals of the AA playoffs in Croydon having been given a bye for finishing top of the Northern division.

In 2026 the Bladerunners will play in the Third Division North as part of the restructuring of the British Baseball Federation this is a combination of some AAA teams who were not promoted to the new NBL north and all AA teams in the north and promises highly competitive play.

The Bladerunners team 2 will play in Division 4 acting as one of two development teams the other being team 3 who will play in Division 5.

== Season records ==
Team I History
Season	League	Pos	P	W	L	Avg
2011	BBF North East AA		22	13	9	.591
2012	BBF North East AA		26	23	3	.225
2013	BBF North East AA		24	11	13	.458
2014	BBF North East AA		18	13	5	.722
2015	BBF North East AA		26	14	12	.538
2016	BBF North East AA	2nd	26	13	13	.500
2017	BBF North East AAA	2nd	32	14	18	.438
2018	BBL North AA	4th	25	5	20	.200
2019	BBL North A	1st	26	14	12	.538
2020	N/A	N/A	N/A	N/A	N/A	N/A
2021	BBL North AA	2nd	16	10	5	.656
2022 (current)	BBL North AAA	–	–	–	–	–

Team II History
Season	League	Pos	P	W	L	Avg
2019	BBL North A	3rd	28	11	8	.429
2020	N/A	N/A	N/A	N/A	N/A	N/A
2021	BBL North A	6th	14	2	11	.227
2022 (current)	BBL North AAA	–	–	–	–	–

Team III History
Season	League	Pos	P	W	L	Avg
2020	N/A	N/A	N/A	N/A	N/A	N/A
2021	BBL North A	5th	16	6	9	.406
2022 (current)	BBL North AAA	–	–	–	–	–

Team IV History
Season	League	Pos	P	W	L	Avg
2021	BBL North A	3rd	18	13	5	.722

== Current roster (as of 2026 INCOMPLETE) ==
Roster
Player	Nationality	Positions	Bat/Throw
88 Nestor Martinez	(Venezuela)	P/SS	R/R
37 Kevin Sullivan	(United States)	SS/3B	R/R
11 Paul Grime	(United Kingdom)	OF/SS/P	R/R
36 Iwan Struggles	(United Kingdom)	SS/OF	R/R
99 Jonny Allison	(United Kingdom)	P/IF/OF	R/R
34 Marco Foglia	(Italy)	2B/SS	R/R
85 Michael Pomranz	(United States)	3B/IF/P	R/R
4 Paul Cassidy	(United Kingdom)	1B/3B	R/R
0 Alan Bowers	(United Kingdom)	P/3B	R/R
89 Martin Hingley	(United Kingdom)	C/2B/SS	L/R
56 Majid Hussain	(United Kingdom)	P/IF	R/R
51 Thomas Spradling	(United States)	P/1B	R/R
18 John Briscoe	(United Kingdom)	OF	R/R
98 Phil Baines	(United Kingdom)	OF/C/2B	R/R
27 Connor Brosnan	(United Kingdom)	OF/2B	R/R
9 Scott Lingrell	(United States)	1B	R/R
15 Sean Briscoe	(United Kingdom)	C	R/R
46 Stu Garner	(United Kingdom)	P/OF/1B	R/R
59 Jack Clifford	(United Kingdom)	IF/C/P	R/R
29 Scott Davies	(United Kingdom)	IF/C/P	R/R
49 Christopher Dixon	(United Kingdom)	P/SS	R/R
74 Ben Green	(United Kingdom)	IF/C/OF	R/R
55 Jack Power	(South Africa)	IF/P	L/L
90 Tim Ennis	(United Kingdom)	IF/P	R/R
72 Tim Pickin	(United Kingdom)	C/3B	R/R

== Retired numbers ==
23 Frazer Longford (Manager; 1995–1998)

28 Jay 'Flanders' Stearns (Manager; 1998–2012)

== See also ==
- Baseball
- Baseball in the United Kingdom
