= Birmingham Baseball Club =

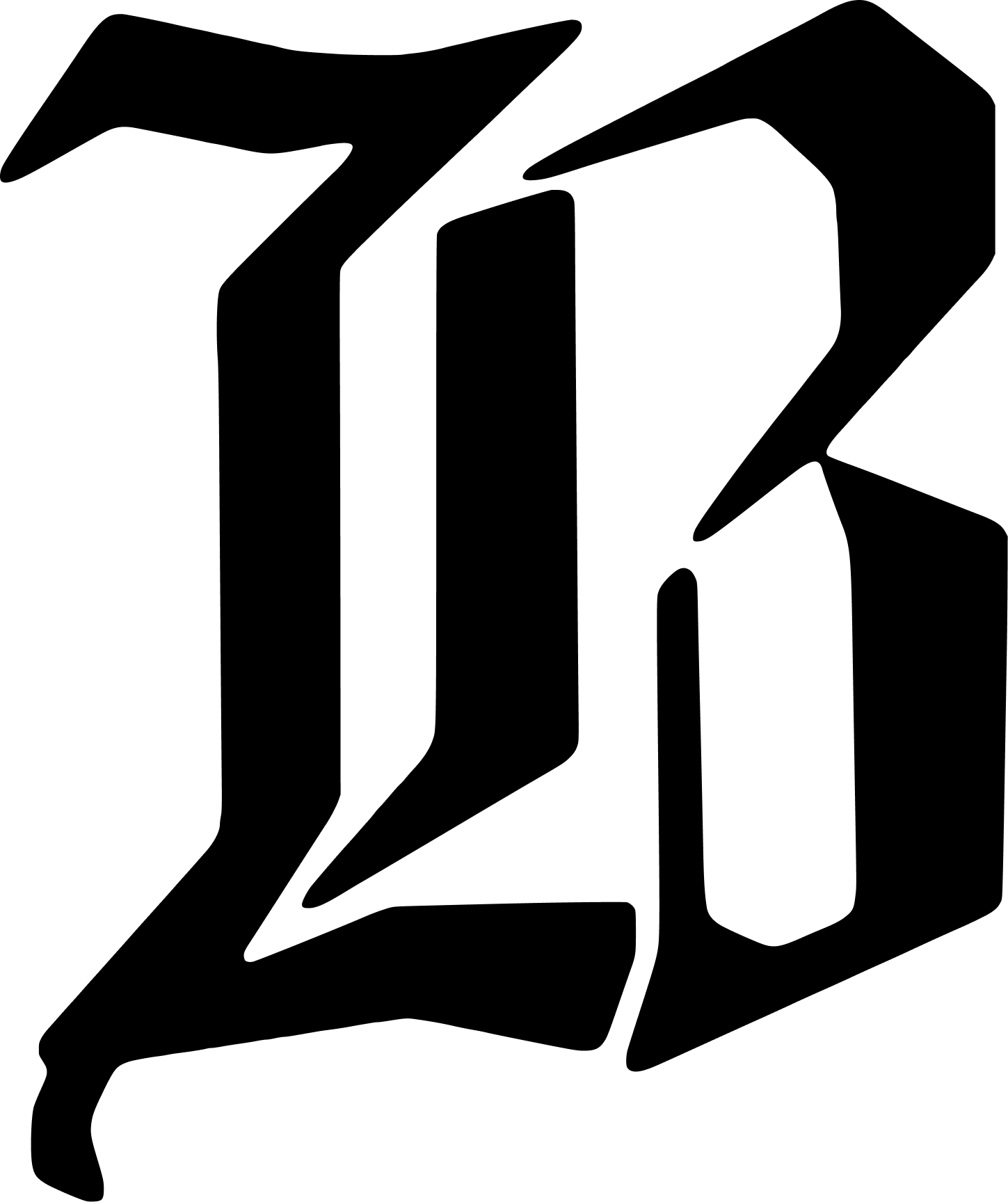
- Logo

Information
- League: British Baseball Federation Division 2 (Metalheads); British Baseball Federation Division 4 (Bats)
- Location: Marston Green, United Kingdom
- Ballpark: Marston Green Recreation Ground
- Founded: 2003
- League championships: 2024
- Division championships: 2005; 2006; 2008; 2015; 2016; 2017; 2024
- Former name: Birmingham Maple Leafs (2003–2014); Birmingham Bandits (2014-2020)
- Coach: Andres Assuncao (Metalheads); Zak Ramadan (Bats); Jon Craig (Warpigs); Said Bayan (GOATs); Jessica Hastings (Women)
- Website: birminghambaseball.co.uk

Current uniforms
Home

Birmingham Baseball Club is an English baseball club based in Marston Green, situated in the West Midlands region of England.

== History ==
Founded in 2003 by a local enthusiast, the team was originally named the Birmingham Maple Leafs. This was an homage to the members of the Royal Canadian Army Medical Corps who were based at No.7 Canadian General Hospital in Marston Green, and took up baseball as recreation.

The club changed its name to the Birmingham Bandits in 2014 and competed at both AA and AAA levels within the British baseball system.

The club changed its name again in 2020, with the team becoming the Birmingham Metalheads, referencing the musical heritage of the region. In 2023, the club launched a second team, the Birmingham Bats, and in 2024 began their youth programme, the Birmingham GOATs. In 2026, the club launched a third, development-focused team, the Birmingham Warpigs.

In 2024, the Birmingham Metalheads won the BBF Summer Cup Silver Level and the WMBL championship. The club announced the formation of a women's baseball program in early 2025.

== Ballpark ==
All teams play their home games at Marston Green Recreation Ground. The recreation ground has been used for baseball as far back as World War II, when it was used by recovering members of the Royal Canadian Army Medical Corps.

== Season by season record ==
Metalheads

Season	League	Finish	Wins	Losses	Win%	GB	Post-Season	Awards
2021	West Midlands Baseball League	6th	2	10	.167	7.5		Tim Kempf (Team MVP)
2022	West Midlands Baseball League	5th	7	7	.500	6		Bob Rowe (Team MVP)
2023	West Midlands Baseball League	3rd (East)	9	5	.643	5		Bob Rowe (Team MVP)
2024	West Midlands Baseball League	1st (East)	10	1	.909	5	2-0	BBF Summer Cup Champions, WMBL Champions. Andres Assuncao (Team MVP)
2025	British Baseball Federation AAA	4th	8	16	.333	9.5		Andres Assuncao (Team MVP)

Bats

Season	League	Finish	Wins	Losses	Win%	GB	Post-Season	Awards
2023	West Midlands Baseball League	5th (West)	1	13	.071	5		Carl Lewis (Team MVP)
2024	West Midlands Baseball League	4th (West)	2	9	.208	6.5		James Marshall (Team MVP)
2025	West Midlands Baseball League	3rd	8	6	.571	6	0-1	James Marshall (Team MVP)
