= Croydon Pirates Baseball Club =

London sports team

Croydon Pirates
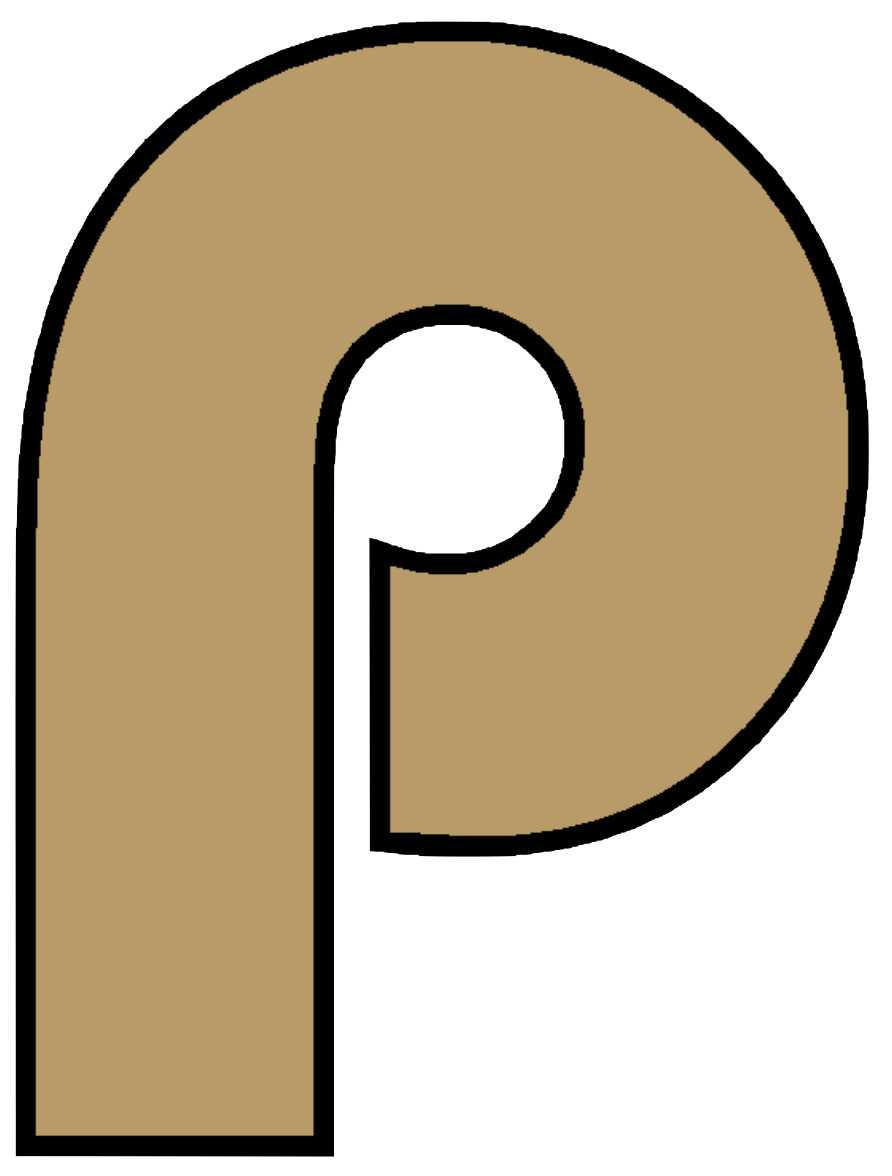
- Cap insignia

Information
- League: British Baseball Federation (BBF) AA South
- Location: Waddon, Croydon, England
- Ballpark: Roundshaw Fields Dave Ward Field
- Founded: 1981
- League championships: 2004, 2005 (NL); 2005, 2008 (AA)
- Former name: Croydon Borough Pirates, South London Pirates
- Colors: Black, gold and grey
- Retired numbers: 42
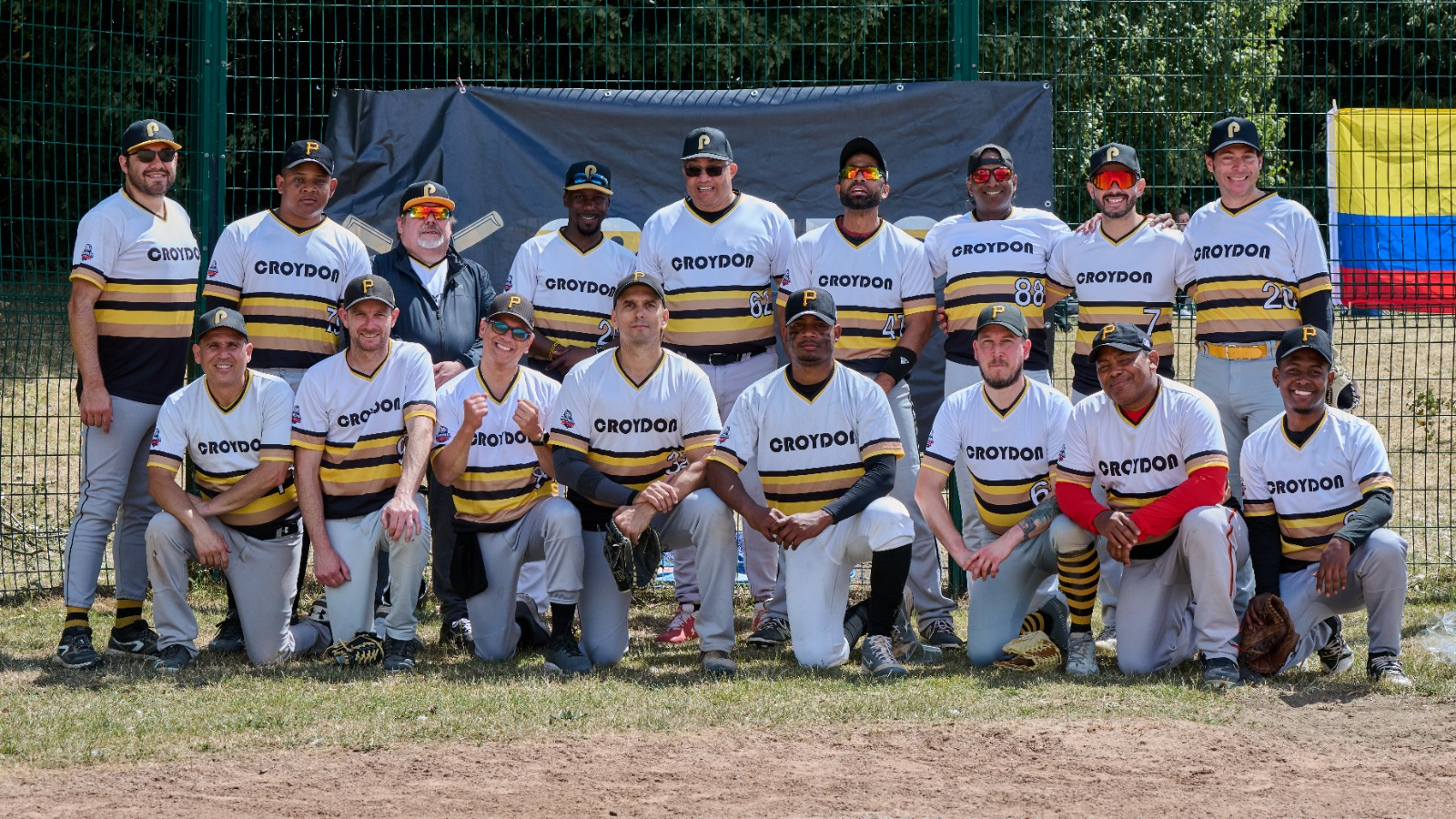
- Website: https://www.croydonpiratesbaseball.com/ 2022 Team Photo

The Croydon Pirates, known between 2012 and 2019 as the South London Pirates, is a British baseball club based in South London. They have two diamonds in Roundshaw playing fields in Sutton, UK the main one being Dave Ward Field. Previously, Roundshaw and the Pirates have been hosts to the yearly London Tournament and on occasions the BBF's National Finals.

From 2004 until 2017, the Pirates were made up of different teams competing at various levels including the National League, double-A, and single-A. Since 2020, the team has competed only at the double-A level.

== History ==
=== Early history ===
The club was formed around 1980 by Eric Petrie and Pete Paulley, who had previously played for the Croydon Blue Jays. The first team played as the Croydon Borough Pirates and placed 3rd in the 1981 Southern England Baseball Association (Group B) division with a 5–11 record.

For the 1989 season, the team was renamed the Croydon Pirates, continuing to play in the 2nd Division which by this time featured twelve teams. They finished the season placed 4th with a 15–10 record, including a seven-inning, one-hitter in which pitcher Chris Gahan recorded 21 strikeouts against the Croydon Blue Jays.

In the 1990s, the Pirates continued to set unexpected records. In 1992, across 16 games, the team collectively notched 355 stolen bases with zero times caught stealing. Club founder Eric Petrie recorded the most, with 48.

=== National success ===
From 2004 the team's top players formed the P1 roster, which competed in the National Baseball League, the top flight of British baseball. The P1 team were National Champions in 2004, defeating the Windsor Bears 12–10 in the National Championship game, and again in 2005, beating the Brighton Buccaneers 2–0 in a best-of-three series.

After being runners-up to the Richmond Flames in 2006, their 2007 regular season record of 26 wins and 0 losses earned them the right to compete in the Final 4 tournament for the 4th consecutive year, on the weekend of 1–2 September 2007 along with the London Mets, Menwith Hill Patriots and Liverpool Trojans. Croydon and the Mets won their semi-finals to advance to the final, where the Pirates were defeated 2–0 in a best-of-3 series.

=== Developmental team ===
Around this time a second roster of developmental players was started, which competed at the single-A level. In 2005 they became Premier Division Champions, notably winning 9 of their last 10 games to claim the title.

In 2008, this P3 team again won their British Baseball single-A division, finishing the season with a record of 10 wins and 2 losses. They were promoted to the double-A division for the 2009 season.

=== 2012–2017: The South London Pirates ===
In 2012 the club changed its name to the South London Pirates. South London Pirates I (formerly P1) played in the British NBL; while South London Pirates III (P3) played in the AA South Division. However, in 2017, falling player numbers halted the club from competing in either league.

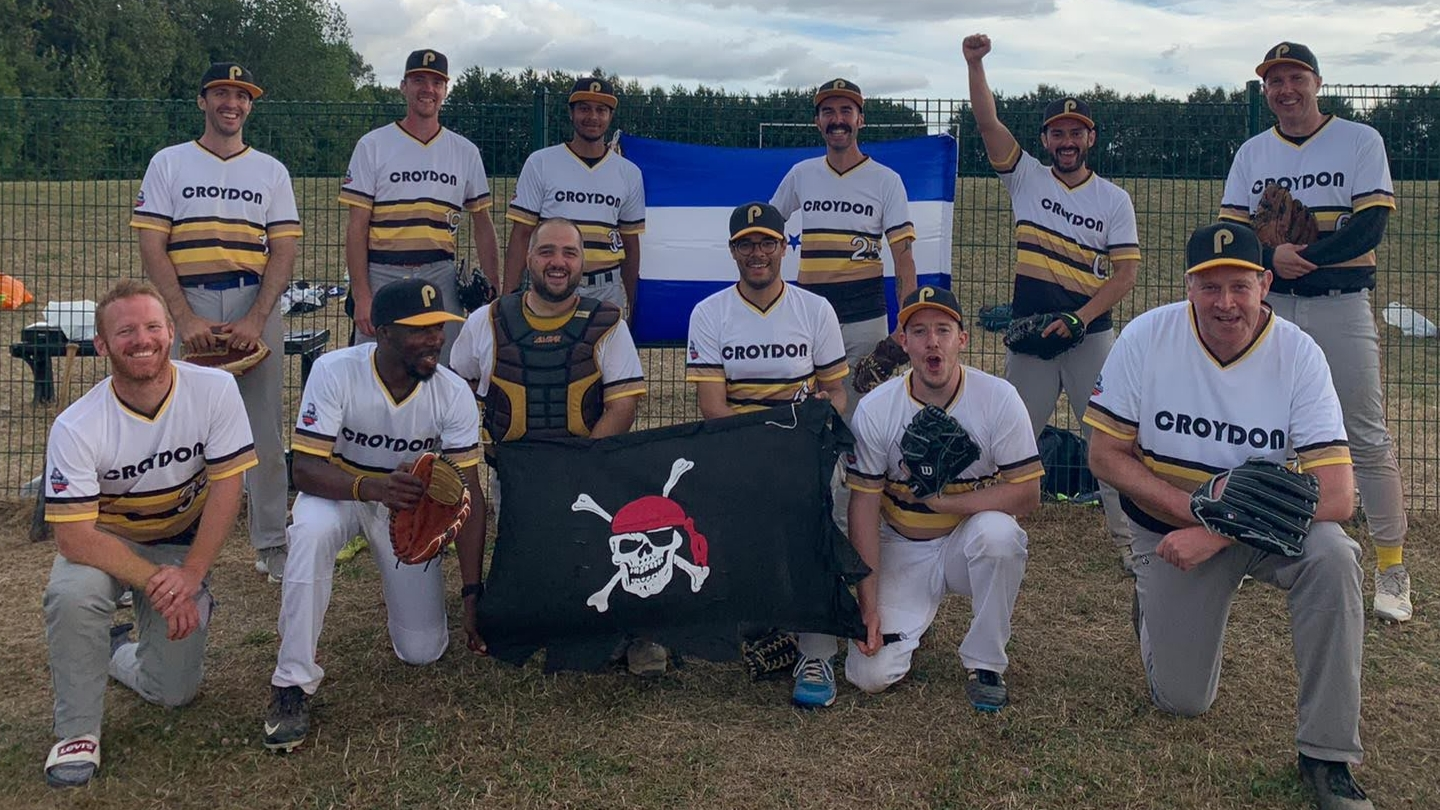
2020 Croydon Pirates

=== 2019 revival and current team ===
After two years without a team, the Pirates once again began playing under the Croydon name and hosted a series of friendlies in autumn 2019, before joining the AA South Division for the 2020 season, competing against the Guildford Mavericks, London Musketeers, Richmond Dragons, and South Coast Pirates.

The season, shortened due to COVID-19, saw the team competing in a series of double-headers throughout August, finishing 4th with a 3–4 record along with one rained-off game.

The 2021 season brought greater success, however, with the team posting a 21–9 season record and narrowly losing to the London Sidewinders 20–19 in the playoffs. They beat the Milton Keynes Bucks 13–10 to place 3rd overall.

== Home ground ==
The Croydon Pirates play their home games at Roundshaw Playing Fields in Waddon, located a few miles southwest of Croydon. The playing fields occupy part of the site of the former Croydon Airport, London's primary airport in the interwar years.

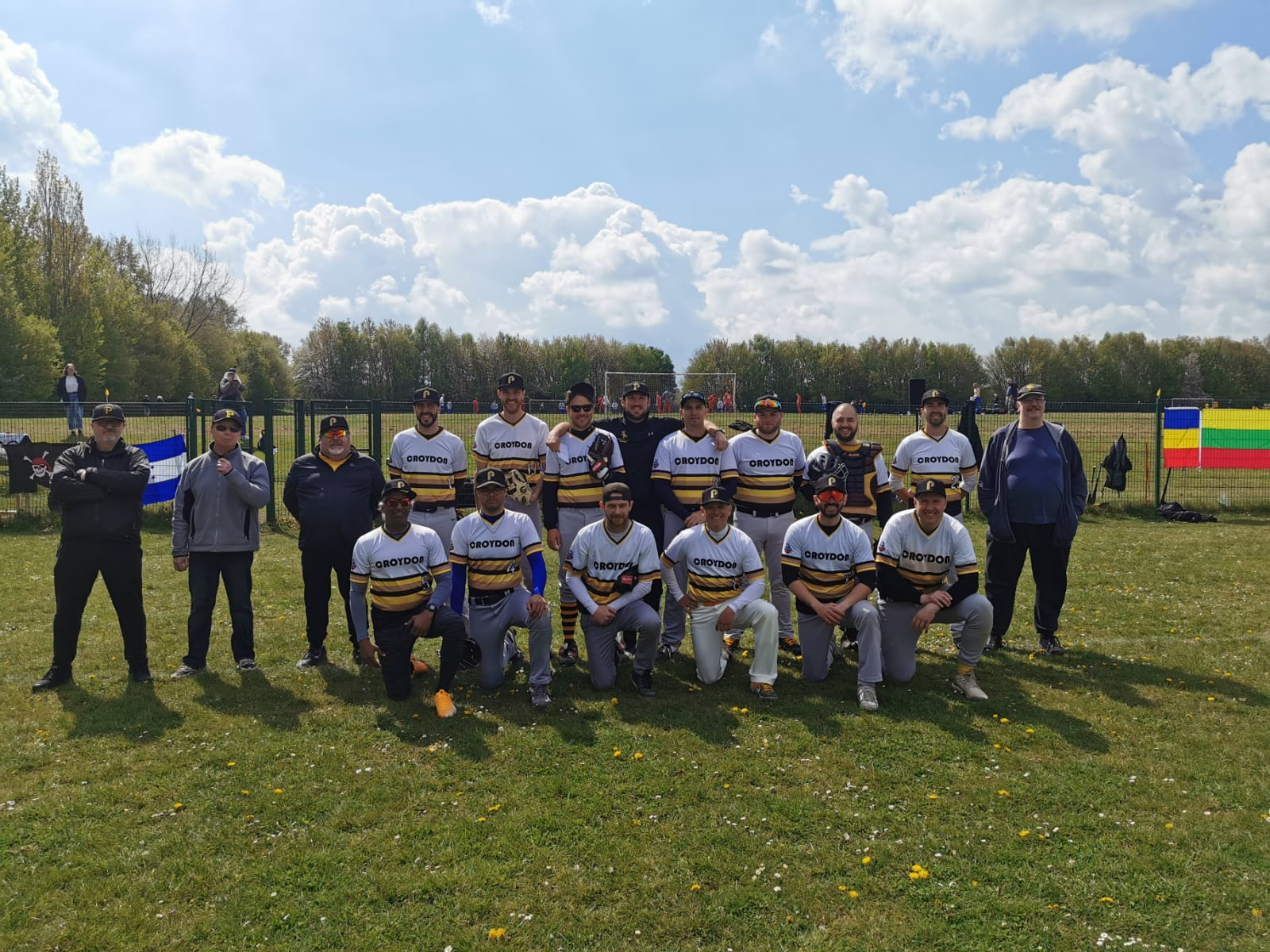
Opening Day 2021

Currently, the Pirates have the use of two purpose-built diamonds, including Dave Ward Field, a fenced field measuring 395 ft from home plate to the centre field boundary. Named in honour of the former Pirates player and manager, its left field and right field lines measure 320 ft and 307 ft respectively, and there is a bullpen behind the left field foul line. The other field is unnamed and has a full dirt infield and unfenced outfield. Both make use of the shared pavilion on Hannibal Way.

== The London Tournament ==
Throughout its history, the club has regularly hosted an invitational tournament at Roundshaw, usually held around mid-July and known as The London Tournament. Open to a variety of teams from around the British leagues, the popular weekend-long competition has also included a Home Run Derby. The Croydon Wolves, with whom the Pirates shared in the 1990s, have also hosted.

== Notable former players ==
- Matt Ayling (GB Men's National Fast-Pitch Softball Team)
- Clare Butler (GB Women's National Fast-Pitch Softball Team)
- Steve Fullan (GB Men's National Fast-Pitch Softball Team, Manager)
- Glenda Lawson (first female UK player)
- Dave Ward
- Jon Ossoff
- Eric Petrie
- Jeffrey May (writer and journalist)
- Pete Paulley
- Darrin Ward (GB National Baseball Team pitcher, 1996)
- Brett Willemburg (South Africa National Baseball Team shortstop, leading batting average in 2006)
- Jesse Quiñones (film and television director)
- Maikel Azcuy (GB Men's National Team, British Baseball Hall of Fame)

== See also ==
- Baseball in the United Kingdom
- British Baseball Federation

== Sources ==
- Croydon Pirates 30th Anniversary Yearbook (2011)
