= Edinburgh Diamond Devils =

The Edinburgh Diamond Devils are a baseball club that was formed in Edinburgh, Scotland. The club has 3 senior teams, the Diamond Devils, Cannons, and Giants. All 3 teams train together and play their home games at Warriston Playing Fields near the Royal Botanic Garden Edinburgh. The club refers to the field as Bobby Thomson Field in honour of the former major leaguer who was born in Scotland.

The club also has a little league baseball programme which shares the same field. All teams are open to players of all abilities.

The Diamond Devils are the largest baseball club in Scotland with three adult teams and two junior teams.

The 3 senior teams all play in the Scotland National League. Since 2009 an Edinburgh team has won the league title each year until 2016. The reigning league champions are the Diamond Devils who have won the league title 4 consecutive seasons. Prior to this streak the Cannons won 3 consecutive league titles.

== History ==
Baseball has been played in the Edinburgh area since the 1950s when it was played at United States Air Force bases at Kirknewton, then in Midlothian, and East Fortune in East Lothian, both just a few miles from the city. The Edinburgh Diamond Devils baseball club was formed in 1986 as the Edinburgh Royals. As one of the teams involved in the inaugural Scottish League, the Devils have enjoyed a long and rich history. League success came in 1991, two years after the 'Royals' became the 'Reivers' with the team claiming its first Scottish Championship. 1992 saw the team repeat as national champions, becoming the first team to do so in league history and saw the start of the club's first youth team, the Blue Jays.

1993 and 1994 were barren years for the team as Glasgow and Dundee emerged as national powers, however 1995 saw a significant change in team fortunes. Long-time General Manager Donald Brotchie retired from baseball and junior team head coach Nick Clark assumed the mantle of responsibility. A superb Reivers team was assembled which won the national title with an 11–1 record for the first time in three years. The team also won the Scottish Cup tournament. Double glory was secured when the Blue Jays won the first ever Scottish Junior League title with a 10–0 record. 1995 will forever be known as the year the organisation turned the corner and emerged as one of the biggest and best baseball clubs in Britain.

1996 saw the Reivers relinquish their title after a 6–6 season but 1997 and 1998 saw the team return to power with a back-to-back 11–1 seasons and another two titles.

In 1999, as a result of the creation of a new Edinburgh rugby team called the Reivers, the club changed to the Edinburgh Diamond Devils and left the Scottish League to join the British Baseball League – Division 1. This was a first for a Scottish team. Hard work paid off with a successful first foray into this league with the Devils gaining promotion to the top-flight of British baseball, the BBF Premier Division. In addition, the team became a major supporter of the Scotland National Team and 15 Devils were selected for an international match with England staged at Meadowbank Stadium, Edinburgh. Although defeated 11–13, Team Scotland enjoyed a tremendous occasion with almost 1,000 fans turning out to see the game. 1999 also saw the expansion of the team's youth programme to incorporate a four-team youth league within the city and a school development scheme called 'Pitch, Hit and Run' which provides baseball for children in 17 schools across the city.

2000 saw the Devils endure a tough first season of Premier League baseball but it ended with a glorious Team Scotland victory over England by a score of 18–5 in the annual international. Perhaps the most exciting development was the team's qualification for the June 2001 C.E.B. (Confederation of European Baseball) Cup of Cups tournament in Prague, the first time ever that a Scottish team has entered a European competition. This will be the most significant boost for Scottish baseball in its history... something that the Edinburgh Diamond Devils baseball organisation will take pride in doing.

In 2007 the Diamond Devils won the Scottish National League with one of the best records in the history of the league, 15–1.

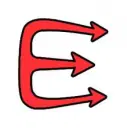
Alternate Logo

In 2010 the Diamond Devils split into two teams, the second being the Edinburgh Cannons, which went on to win the Scottish National League in their inaugural season. The team also moved to a new field in the centre of Edinburgh, near the Botanical Gardens. The two teams combined to make the Diamond Devils' first trip abroad to Europe in four years. They travelled to Norway and defeated the Kristiansand Suns 12–2 and Stavanger 17–3.

In 2011 interest increased again with the Edinburgh Giants being added to the league. The Cannons won the league for the second year in a row. The second North Sea Cup was played in Edinburgh against the Kristiansand Suns. The Devils and Cannons both won with the Giants losing narrowly to the Suns on the final day.

In 2012 the Cannons won the league title for the 3rd straight year.

In 2013 the Diamond Devils won the league title for the first time since 2009 with a 13–2 record. This season marked the start of a dominating run the Diamond Devils as they went on to win the league title in 2014, 2015, and 2016. The Diamond Devils are the only team to win four consecutive titles in the current league. The 2016 team finished with a record of 13–3, which marks the highest number of losses in a season for the Diamond Devils since 2012.

The Edinburgh teams all combined together to form a Scotland team for the annual Belfast baseball tournament in 2015 and 2016. In the 2015 tournament the combined team finished in 3rd place, which was the highest finish for a Scottish baseball team at a tournament abroad for more than 20 years.

On 22 August 2021, the Edinburgh Diamond Devils defeated the Glasgow Galaxy to win the 2021 Scottish National League ending the Glasgow Galaxy's 3 year league winning streak that took place from 2017 to 2019. The 2021 team finished the season with a record of 10-1.

The Diamond Devils are currently the team with the most Scottish National League titles at 7.

On 5 September 2021, the Edinburgh Diamond Devils became the first team to win the inaugural Scottish National Developmental A League.

On 26 September 2021, the Edinburgh Diamond Devils defeated the Edinburgh Cannons in the final of the 2021 Caledonia Cup to become the first team in Baseball Scotland history to win the league title, the developmental A league title and the Caledonia Cup in one year.

== See also ==
- Baseball in the United Kingdom
- Sport in Scotland
