= London Mets =

London Mets Baseball and Softball Club
- Logo

Information
- League: BBF National League
- Location: London
- Ballpark: Finsbury Park, Harringay, North London
- Founded: 1988
- Nickname: Mets
- League championships: 2007, 2008, 2015, 2017-2026
- Former name: London Millions, London Meteors
- Website: Official website

The London Mets Baseball and Softball Club are the largest baseball club in Britain. The club fields teams at every level of the British Baseball Federation league system and have won the National Baseball League title for ten consecutive years.

== History ==
The club began as an adult softball team in 1988 and were initially called the London Millions, after the name of the company which sponsored them. In 1995 the club established a separate baseball programme under the name London Meteorites.

In the past decade, the London Mets have rapidly expanded their youth programme. The club runs training sessions for young people aged from 7 to 16 years old and has three youth teams that play in the Southern Division of the BBF national youth baseball league. The Club won a national CCPR Sports Club of the Year award and the local Haringey Sports Club of the Year award in 2007.

The London Mets Pony (under-16's) team won their BBF National Championship in 2007. They were the only British club to field two Bronco (under 13's) teams in 2007.

In 2007 the club's popularity - along with the need to provide development opportunities for older club members - meant that they were able to start a senior team for the first time, which was entered into the BBF National Baseball League - the highest level baseball league in Britain.

In this first season in the National Baseball League the London Mets had a W20 L6 record for the season. They played the Croydon Pirates in the 2007 BBF National Championship Final 4. The Mets won the best of three final series 2-0 to be crowned National Champions.

The London Mets NBL team maintained a W23 L1 record through the 2008 season, losing only to Croydon. The London Mets faced the Richmond Flames in the 2008 BBF National Championship Final 4, winning the 9-inning final 11-4 to regain their National Championship title.

The 2007 and 2008 team included MLB on five analyst Josh Chetwynd.

In 2008 the London Mets expanded with a second senior team, the London Metros, in the BBF AAA League. In their first season the London Metros finished in 2nd place in the AAA South Group B and won the Wild Card spot in the 2008 BBF National Championship Final 4 with a W18 L8 record. The London Metros lost 12-6 to the Oxford Kings in the semi-final round to take 3rd place.

For 2009, the club has added a third senior team, the London Marauders, which will play in the BBF A League.

The Club is the first British youth baseball club to field two Bronco teams for two consecutive seasons.

== Affiliated club teams ==
The London Mets Youth Baseball Club train and play in Finsbury Park, Harringay, North London, where they have a clubhouse and two diamonds.

Level	Team
NBL	London Mets
Division 2	London Metros
Division 3	London Mauraders, London Meteors
Division 4	London Minotaurs, London Mercury
Division 5	London Mastadons, London Mercenaries, London Mayhem
Canal League	London Mutineers, Limehouse Cutters, Hackney Regents

== See also ==
- Baseball in the United Kingdom
- British Baseball Federation
