= British Baseball Federation =

United Kingdom sports governing body

- Sport: Baseball
- Jurisdiction: Great Britain
- Abbreviation: BBF
- Founded: 1987
- Affiliation: WBSC
- Regional affiliation: WBSC Europe
- Headquarters: Farnham Royal, England, Great Britain
- President: Richard Evans
- Coach: Bradley Marcelino

Official website
- www.britishbaseball.org.uk
- (United Kingdom)

The British Baseball Federation (BBF) is the national governing body of baseball in Great Britain. Organised modern baseball has been played in Great Britain since the first baseball league began in 1890, with a succession of different governing bodies in place over that time. The BBF was founded in 1987.

The BBF is a federated member of both WBSC Europe and WBSC. Until December 2020, the BBF was a joint member (with the British Softball Federation) of BaseballSoftballUK (BSUK), a sports development agency. On 24 February 2025, the BBF rejoined as a member of BSUK.

The voting members of BBF are the affiliated baseball clubs, life members and the umpires, scorers and coaches associations. The BBF holds an annual general meeting each spring at which the voting members elect an executive board of 11 officials to oversee the body and the sport. All participants (players, coaches, managers, umpires, scorers, etc.) with affiliated clubs and the associations are members of the BBF.

There are organised youth leagues at 10 to 13 (Bronco) and 14 to 16 (Pony) age ranges. There are also GB national teams for youth players U12s, U15s, U18s and U23s. For adults, there are a number of leagues and divisions, split by ability and geographical location. These range from the highly competitive to the recreational.

In 2025 there were 57 clubs, with 105 league teams, as members of the BBF. There are also a number of non-league clubs and teams affiliated to British Baseball. British Baseball also oversees the national team of Great Britain.

== BBF Board ==
The BBF board is elected at AGMs. The current board is comprised as follows:

- President: Richard Evans
- Treasurer: Oona Ylinen
- Secretary: To be appointed
- Senior Affiliated Clubs League Commissioner: Chris Carter
- National Team Programme Official: Glen Robertson
- Development Official: Lee Manning
- Coaches Commissioner: To be appointed
- Youth Affiliated Clubs League Commissioner: Glenn Taylor
- Officials Commissioner: Dave Becker
- Marketing & Communications: Stu Taylor

=== Past presidents ===
- Ian Cox: 2004–06
- Ian Marchment: 2006–07
- Rob Rance: 2007–09
- Mark Salter: 2010–12
- Earl Dix: 2014–16
- Gerry Perez: 2016–21
- Tom Thornhill 2022–24
- Chris Deacon: 2024

== League structure ==
Affiliated clubs may enter as many teams as they wish to play in the BBF baseball leagues. There is a senior bracket for adults, and two youth brackets (10 to 13 and 14 to 16).

The season runs from April to September each year and ends in the National Baseball Championships (previously referred to as 'Final 4s'). National Youth Baseball Championships are also held for the two youth-age brackets (10 to 13 and 14 to 16). Championships are hosted by different clubs around the country each year chosen through a competitive bidding process.

== See also ==
- Baseball in the United Kingdom
- Baseball awards#United Kingdom
- Baseball World Cup
