= List of sports clubs in the London Borough of Richmond upon Thames =

Richmond upon Thames' location within Greater London

This is a list of sports clubs in the London Borough of Richmond upon Thames.

== Bowling ==
- Barnes Bowling Club, established in 1725
- Cambridge Park Bowling and Sports Club, a lawn and indoor bowls club in East Twickenham
- Mid-Surrey Bowling Club, founded in 1922
- North Sheen Bowling Club in Kew
- Priory Park Club in Kew, which was founded in 1905
- Sheen Common Bowling Club, founded in the 1920s
- Strawberry Hill Bowling Club, founded in 1920
- Teddington Bowling Club, founded in 1910

== Cricket ==
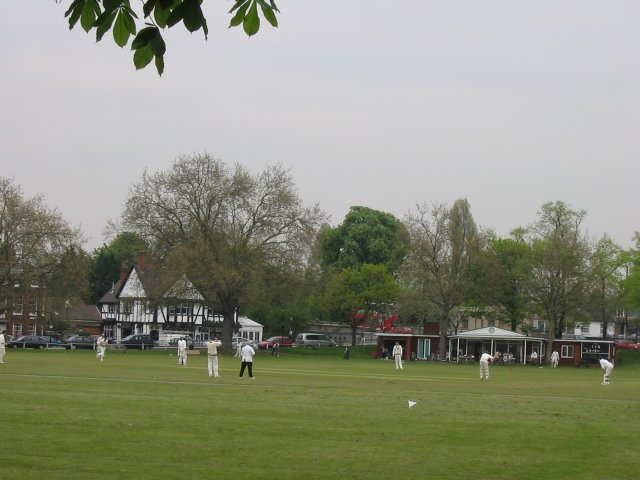
Kew Cricket Club ground on Kew Green

- Barnes Cricket Club
- Barnes Common Cricket Club
- Ham and Petersham Cricket Club, established in 1815
- Hampton Hill Cricket Club, based at Bushy Park; the club also plays at Carlisle Park
- Hampton Wick Royal Cricket Club, founded in 1863
- Kew Cricket Club, formed in 1882, which hosts matches on Kew Green
- The Princes Head Cricket Club, Richmond Green
- Richmond Cricket Club
- Richmond Leg Breakers Cricket Club
- Sheen Park Cricket Club, based at East Sheen Common
- Teddington Cricket Club, based in Bushy Park
- Teddington Town Cricket Club, based in Bushy Park
- Woodlawn Cricket Club, play at Carlisle Park

== Football and rugby ==
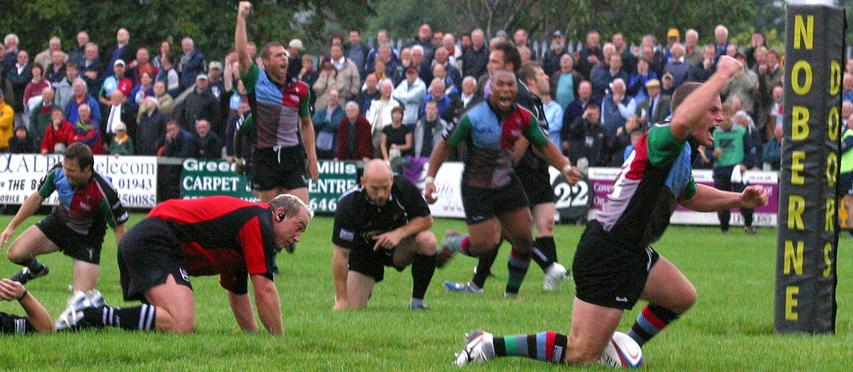
Harlequins celebrating a try during the 2005–06 season

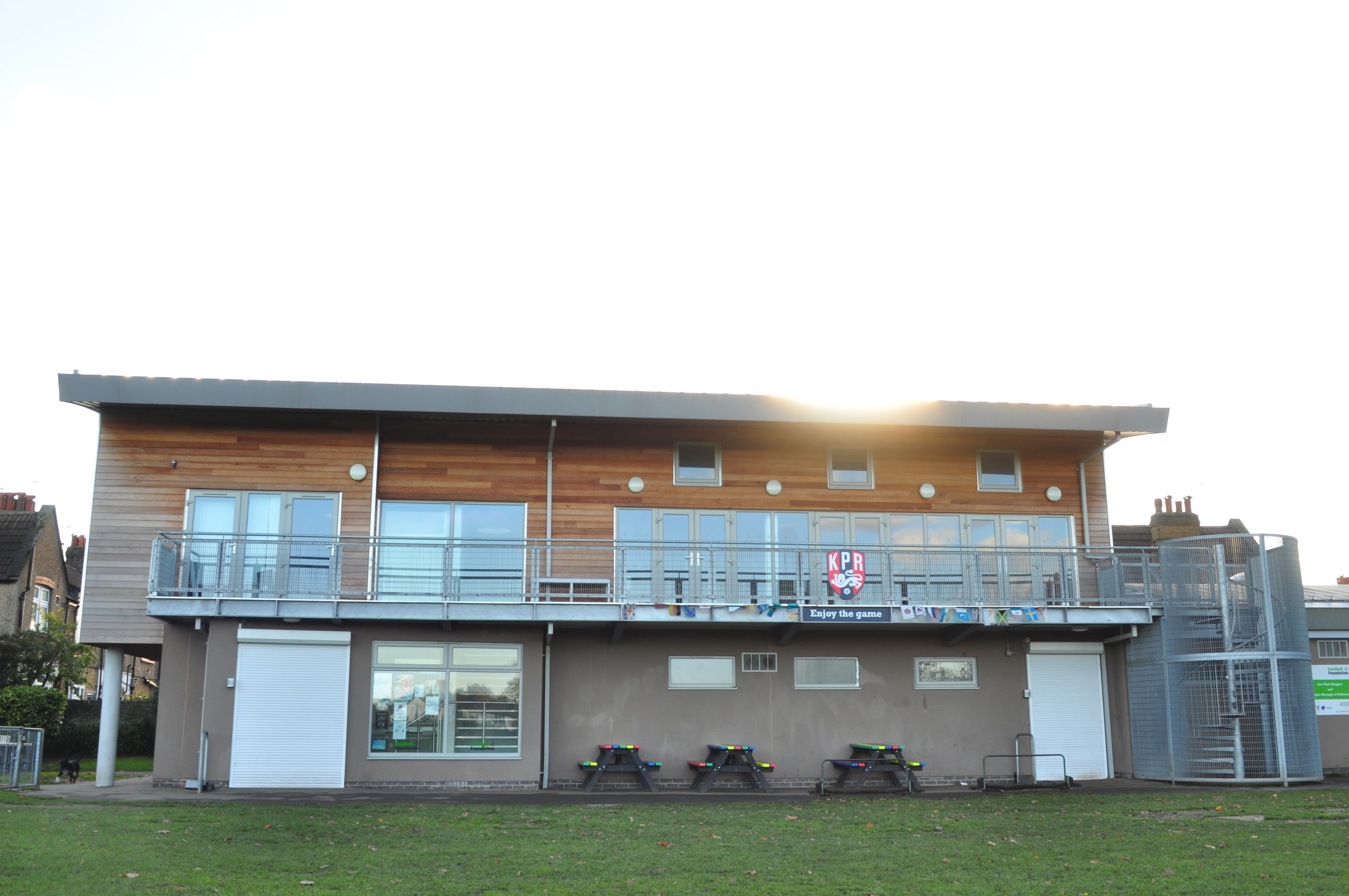
The sports pavilion clubhouse at North Sheen Recreation Ground, used by Kew Park Rangers

- Barnes Eagles F.C., based at Barn Elms Playing Fields, Barnes
- Barnes Rugby Football Club, based at Barn Elms
- Hampton & Richmond Borough F.C., based at Beveree Stadium, Hampton
- Hampton & Richmond Borough Women F.C., based at Beveree Stadium, Hampton
- Harlequin Amateurs Rugby Football Club, who train and play at St Mary's University College, Twickenham
- Harlequin F.C., based at Twickenham Stoop
- Harlequin Ladies Football Club, based at Twickenham Stoop and Old Isleworthians Rugby Football Club
- Kew Park Rangers, a football club for children, based at North Sheen Recreation Ground
- London French RFC, based at based at Barn Elms Playing Fields
- London Scottish F.C., founded in 1878 and based at the Athletic Ground, Richmond
- London Welsh Amateur, whose ground is at Old Deer Park
- Richmond F.C., based at the Athletic Ground, Richmond
- Stonewall F.C., who play at Barn Elms Playing Fields
- Teddington Rugby F.C., based at Bushy Park

== Golf ==
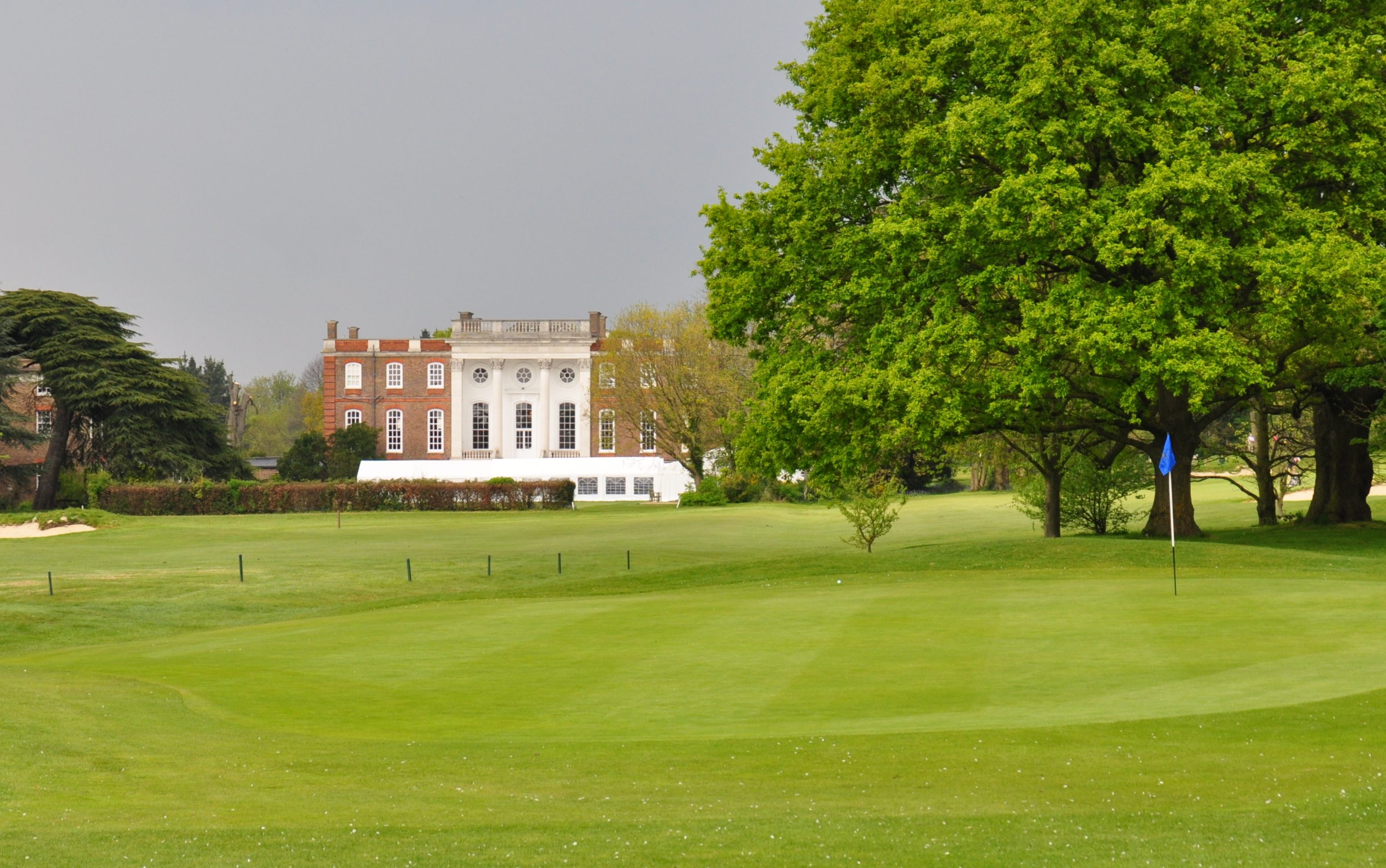
Richmond Golf Club's clubhouse, Sudbrook House, and the 8th green

- Fulwell Golf Club
- Hampton Court Palace Golf Club, based at Hampton Court Park
- Royal Mid-Surrey Golf Club, whose course is in Old Deer Park, Richmond. The club and course were established in 1892
- Richmond Golf Club, whose course is at Sudbrook Park in Petersham. The Grade I listed building, Sudbrook House, in the park, is now the clubhouse
- Richmond Park Golf Club
- The Stage Golfing Society, based at Richmond Golf Club
- Strawberry Hill Golf Club, whose 9-hole course was designed in 1900

== Racquet sports ==
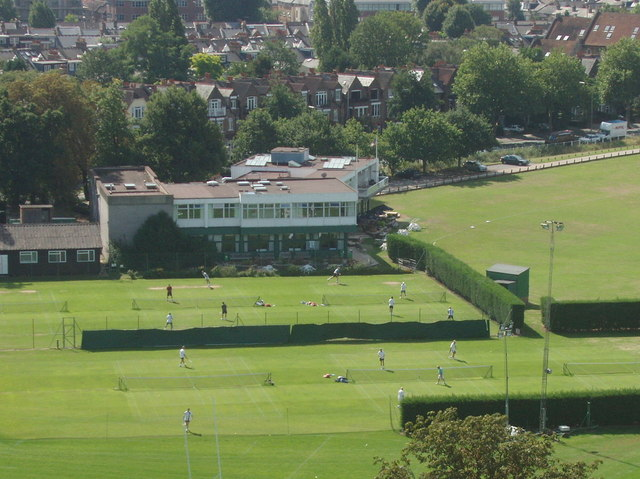
Richmond Lawn Tennis Club viewed from the pagoda in Kew Gardens

- Barnes Squash Club
- Ham and Petersham Lawn Tennis Club, which has courts located on the south avenue to Ham House in conjunction with Grey Court School
- Pensford Tennis Club in Kew
- Priory Park Club in Kew, which was founded in 1905
- Richmond Lawn Tennis Club
- Teddington Lawn Tennis Club in Teddington, founded in 1908
- Sheen Parks Tennis

== Water sports ==
- Barnes Swimming Club

Putney Town Rowing Club

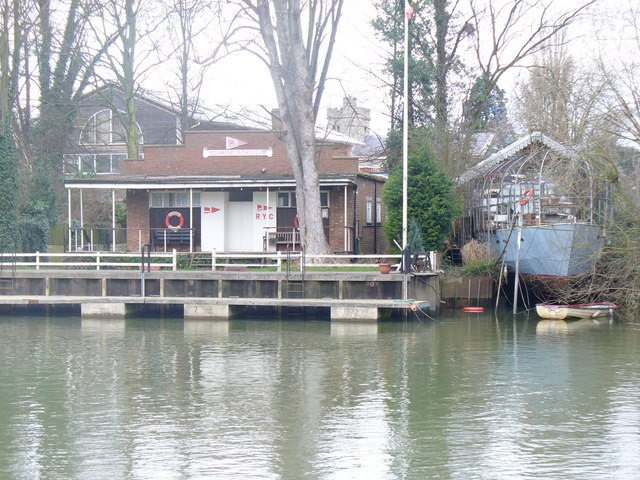
Richmond Yacht Club

- Kingston Royals Dragon Boat Racing Club, based in Teddington
- Putney Town Rowing Club on Townmead Road in Kew
- Richmond Bridge Boat Club
- London Cornish Pilot Gig Club at Richmond Bridge Boathouses
- Richmond Canoe Club
- Richmond Yacht Club, based at Eel Pie Island
- Royal Canoe Club in Teddington, founded in 1866
- Richmond Sub-Aqua Club
- The Skiff Club in Teddington, founded in 1895
- Teddington Sub Aqua Club
- Teddington Swimming Club
- Thames Young Mariners, based in Ham, provides sailing, canoeing, open-water swimming and other sport and outdoor activity facilities
- Twickenham Rowing Club, founded in 1860
- Walbrook Rowing Club in Teddington

== Other ==
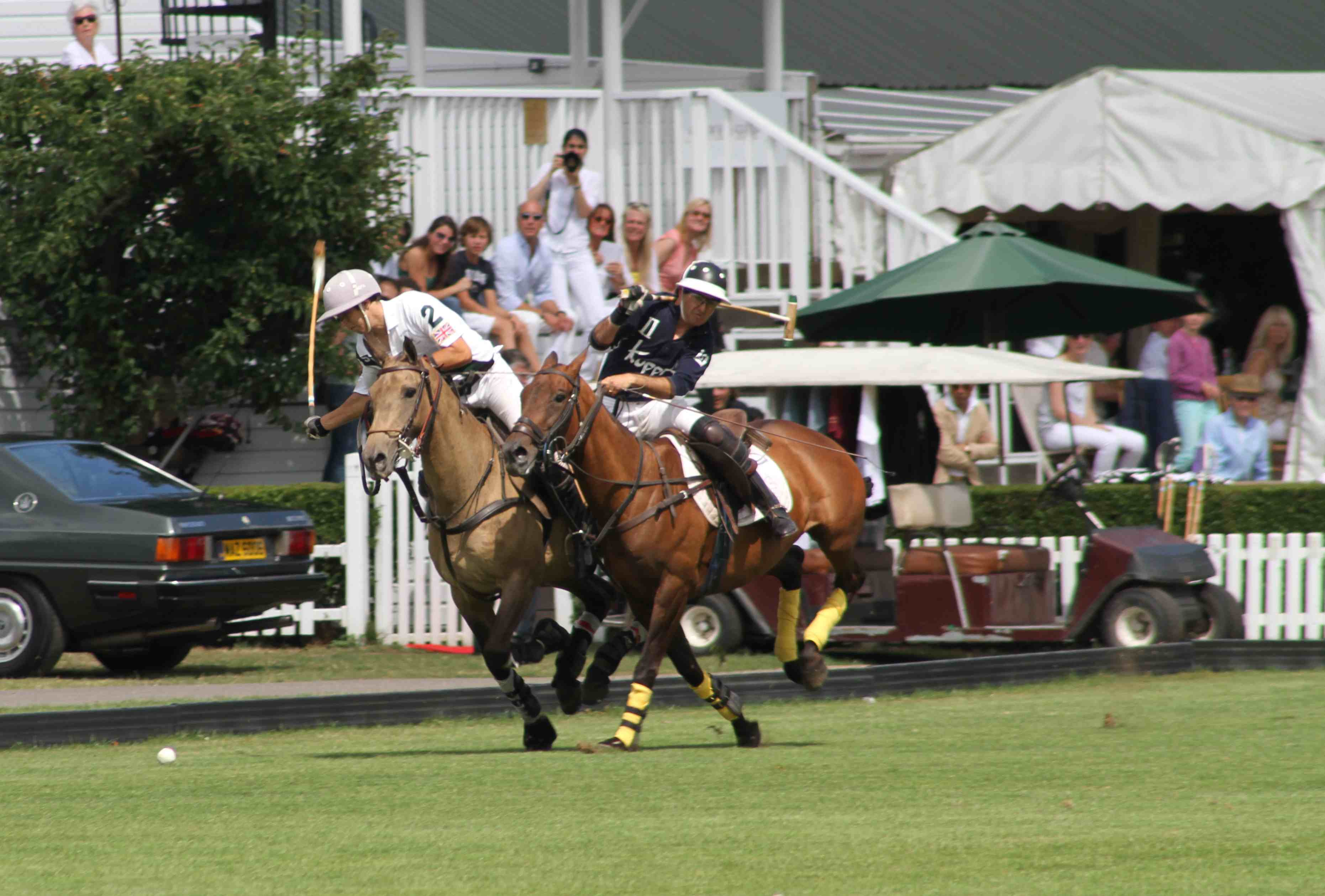
Polo match at the Ham Polo Club

- Barnes Sports Club, which has facilities for hockey, tennis, cricket, squash and personal training
- Ham and Petersham Rifle and Pistol Club, dating from 1906 or perhaps earlier, is located near Ham House, with both indoor and outdoor ranges and caters for archery, pistol and rifle shooting
- Ham Polo Club
- Kew and Ham Sports Association, which provides football and baseball facilities on the playing fields between Ham House and Thames Young Mariners
- Ranelagh Harriers, a road running and cross-country club based in Petersham; it was founded in 1881
- Richmond Baseball and Softball Club, Ham
- Richmond Gymnastics Association, Kew
- Richmond Volleyball
- SIMMSport, junior sports clubs based at St Mary's University, Twickenham. The club offers four programmes: football, rugby union, athletics and gymnastics
- Thames Handball Club, Twickenham
- Royal Richmond Archery Club in Old Deer Park, Richmond, founded in 1873
- Park Lane Stables, a Riding for the Disabled Association equine facility

== See also ==
- List of annual sports events in the London Borough of Richmond upon Thames
