= Electrification of the London and South Western Railway =

Electrification of a railway

The electrification of the LSWR refers to the installation of electric traction on the London and South Western Railway surface network, and its successor the Western Section of the Southern Railway, in England. The LSWR started a programme of electrification in response to rising costs and loss of traffic to street tramways; the first installation was to Kingston, Richmond, Hounslow, Hampton Court and Shepperton, starting in 1917. The third rail DC system was used, as it was assessed to be considerably cheaper to install and maintain than the overhead systems then in use. The rolling stock was constructed by the conversion of relatively new coaches built for suburban steam-hauled operation. The LSWR generated its own electric power at a new power station near Wimbledon. A frequent regular-interval timetable was implemented and the system was a considerable success.

The government forced the grouping of the railways in 1923, under the Railways Act 1921 and the LSWR was part of the larger Southern Railway, together with the South Eastern and Chatham Railway and the London Brighton and South Coast Railway (LBSCR). The LBSCR had adopted an overhead contact system at 6.6 kV 25 Hz for its suburban network. The Southern Railway considered the two systems and decided to adopt the LSWR third rail system, and in due course the LBSCR system was converted, and the third rail system was installed over a large proportion of the suburban area of the Southern Railway, as well as some main line installations. The Portsmouth Direct line was electrified in 1937.

The Southern Railway was nationalised in 1948 and further extensions of the system were installed by British Railways. An overhead contact system was adopted as standard for new routes that were not an extension of existing third rail networks. The third rail system is now (2022) operational over 14% of the total rail network in Great Britain, equating to 36% of the electrified network.

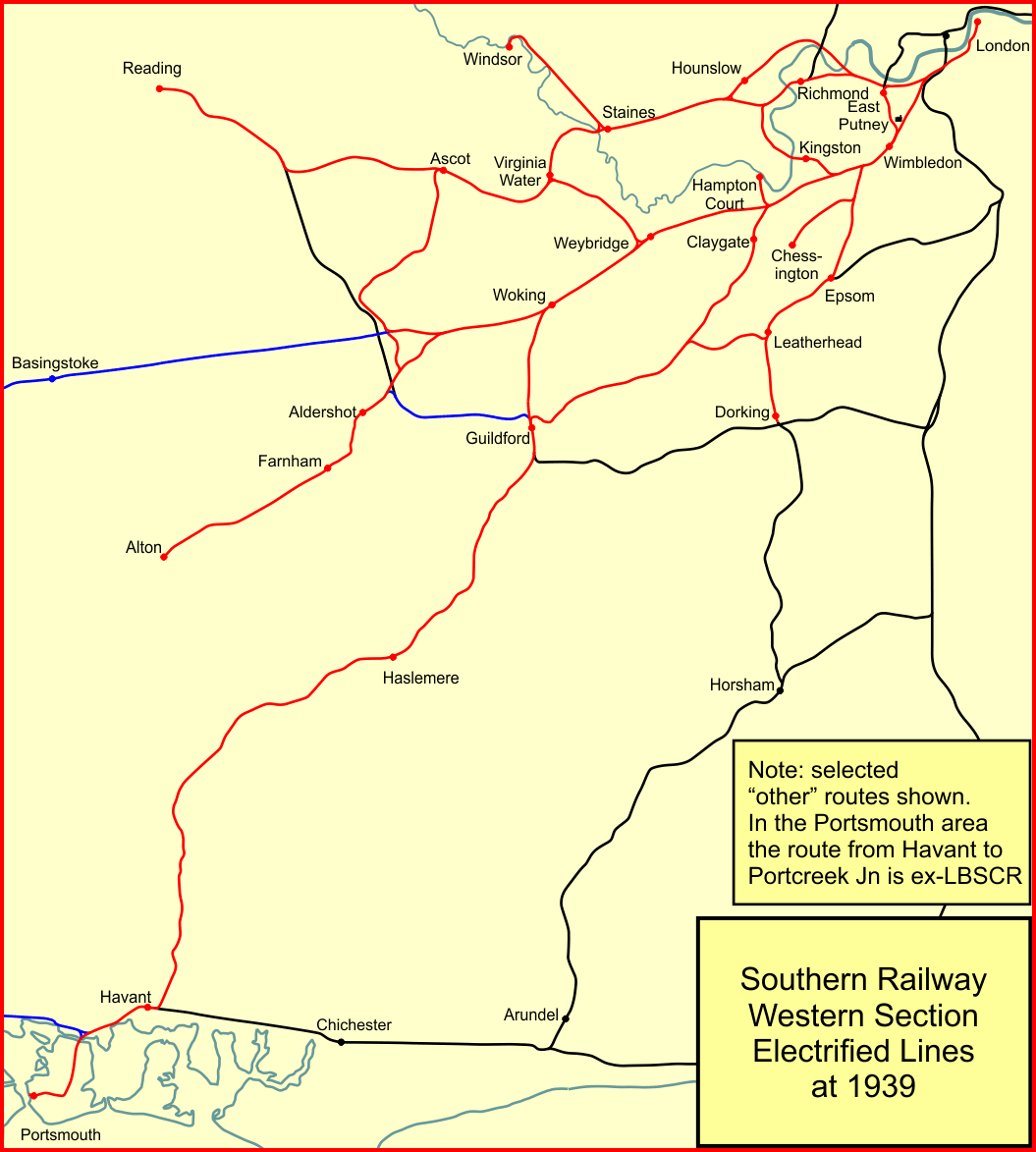
LSWR electrified routes in 1939 (in red)

== Prior systems ==
=== First installations ===
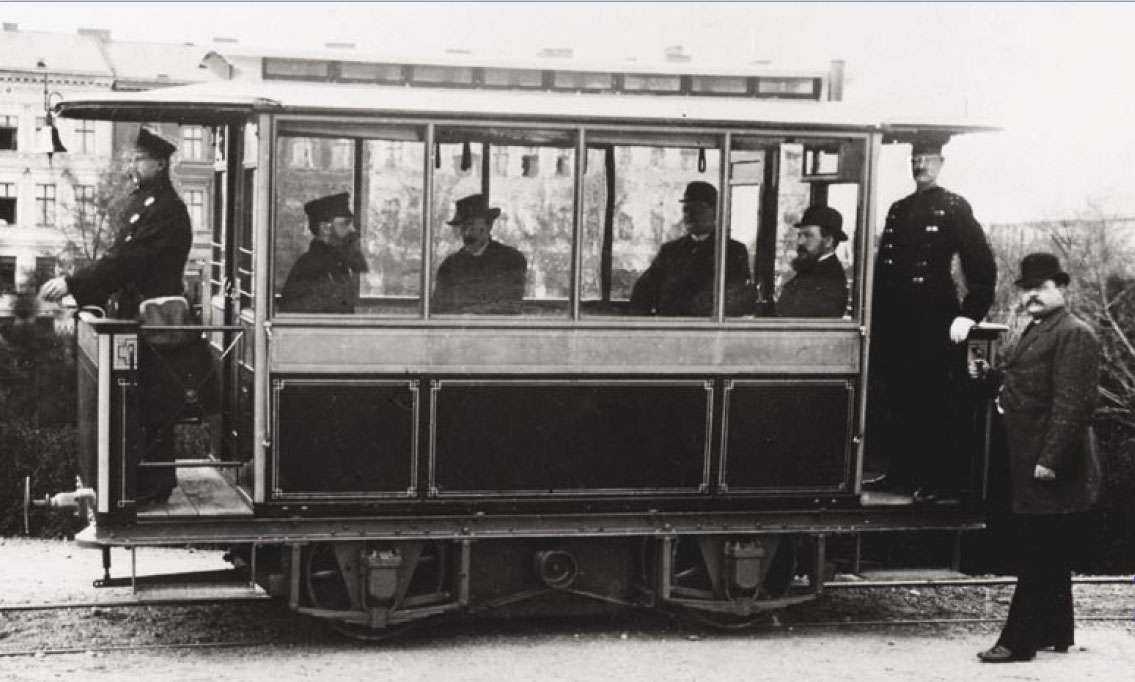
First electric tram- Siemens 1881 in Lichterfelde

The first public electric railway in the world was opened in 1881 in Berlin. An electric tramway service for the use of the public began running from the Anhalt station in Berlin to the suburb of Lichterfelde Ost, as an experimental demonstration system. It ran on dedicated metre-gauge track with an overhead contact wire at 180 V, over a length of 2.45 kilometres (1.52 mi). It was installed by Siemens & Halske.

In August 1883 Magnus Volk inaugurated the first of his electric railways at Brighton, using a 50 V DC third rail system, and in September 1883, an electric line was brought into service in Portrush, Ireland, in connection with the Giant's Causeway. It used a third-rail contact system at 290 V DC. In 1899 the contact system was altered to an overhead contact wire. Voltage drop proved to be an issue.

=== Overhead line systems ===
In 1908 the Lancaster to Morecambe and Heysham line was electrified at 6.6 kV 25 Hz by the Midland Railway as an experiment to demonstrate the practical use of such a system.

In 1903 the London, Brighton and South Coast Railway was concerned about the high cost of operating its inner suburban South London line and the company decided to set about an electrification scheme of the route. Encouraged by the published intentions of the Midland Railway project, the LBSCR decided to adopt a similar overhead contact system at 6.6 kV. Portal gantries were generally used to support the overhead line system, and in the more congested environment of inner South London, it was discovered that standard dimensions were usually inappropriate, so that the majority of the portals were designed individually. This slowed the installation considerably, and added to its cost.

=== Sub-surface lines ===
Many sub-surface urban railways in London, the North-West of England and overseas were powered by electricity; in 1890 the City and South London Railway had been opened, followed in 1898 by the Waterloo and City Railway, and in 1900 by the Central London Railway and in 1904 by the Great Northern and City Railway. Then in 1906 and 1907 the Baker Street and Waterloo Railway, the Charing Cross, Euston and Hampstead Railway and the Great Northern, Piccadilly and Brompton Railway opened. All of these railways operated successfully with third–rail or third-and-fourth rail electric traction. The partly sub-surface (but not tube) Metropolitan Railway had electrified the underground sections of its network in 1905, and part of the Metropolitan District Railway was so treated in 1903. Indeed, the District Railway had been running electric trains over LSWR tracks since 1905, to Richmond from Turnham Green and to Wimbledon from Putney Bridge.

== LSWR electrification ==
=== The need for action ===
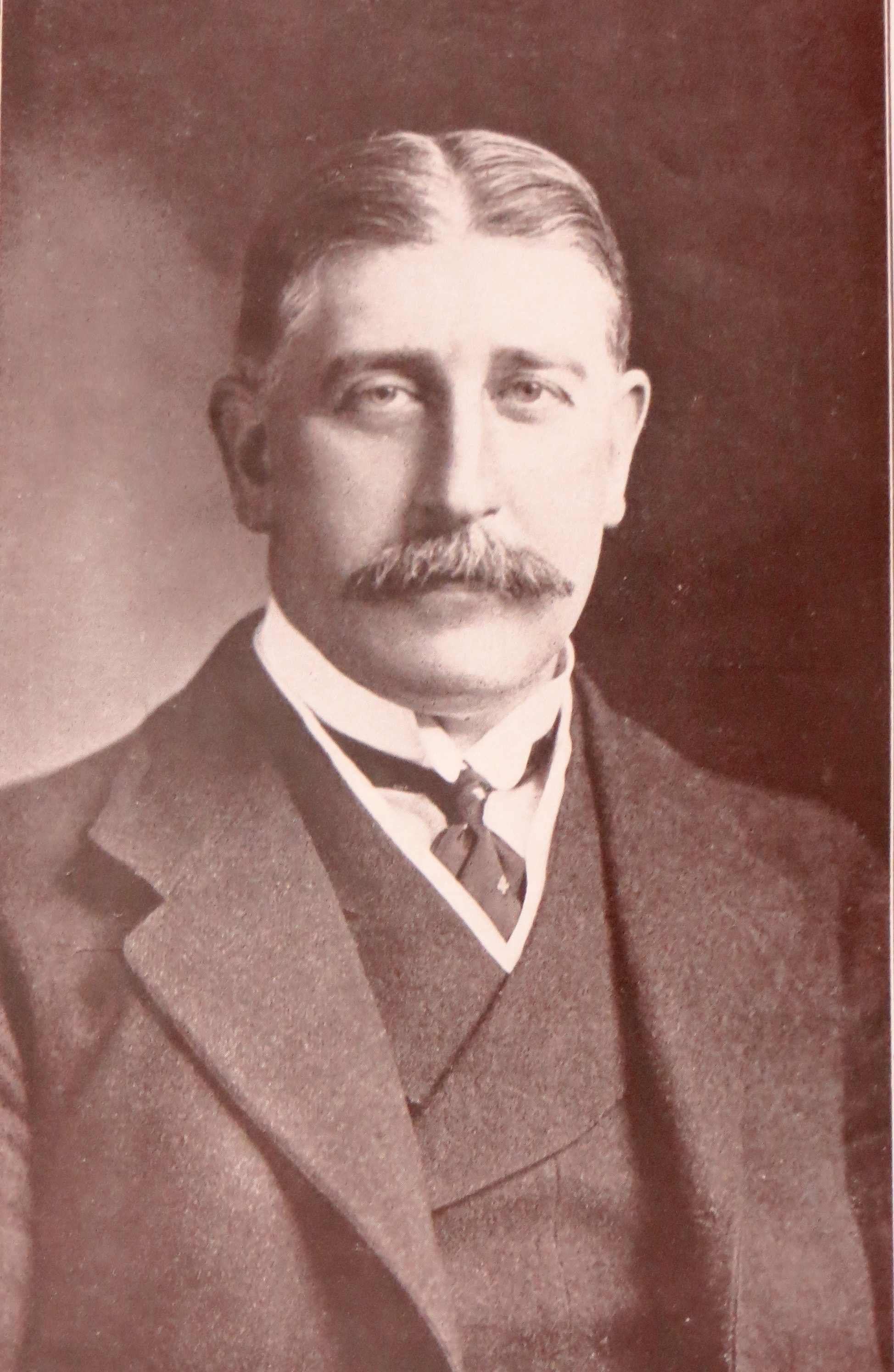
Herbert Ashcombe Walker

In the early years of the twentieth century, the LSWR had a dense steam operated suburban network, but its trains were considered to be slow and infrequent. Street-running tramways were abstracting business from the LSWR: they were frequent and they directly served residential districts that many railway stations failed to approach. The tramcars journeys were not necessarily slower than a stopping train. In addition there was concern that the rival Central London Railway was planning an extension into the LSWR area. It was clear that the LSWR needed to take steps to staunch the loss of business. Herbert Ashcombe Walker was appointed to the post of General Manager of the LSWR from 1 January 1912. He was a dynamic manager and quickly saw that the need was to make the suburban passenger service more attractive, and to make operating and maintenance economies, and electrification was the means of achieving that. He appointed Herbert Jones to the post of Electrical Engineer. Jones had been involved with the pioneer electric tube line, the City and South London Railway.

=== Selection of a system ===
Jones went on a fact-finding trip to the United States later in 1912, to look particularly at DC third-rail installations in use on urban railroads there. He was impressed with what he saw, particularly with regard to the economy of installation and reliability in use of such systems. This resulted in the third-rail DC system being chosen as most suitable for the task by both Jones and Walker. It had the advantage of simple and cheap installation of the contact rail. Transmission required the use of rectifiers and rotary converters, of which the technology was still primitive, but train operation by direct current was now in widespread proven use on railways. A suitable scheme was drawn up very quickly, and was presented to the LSWR Board in December 1912. Adoption of the LBSCR system was considered, but it had significant disadvantages: in particular it was obvious that it had cost much more than the LBSCR had budgeted for, and the catenary systems and structures to carry the overhead contact required a lengthy construction time.

== First electrification scheme ==
=== Scope ===
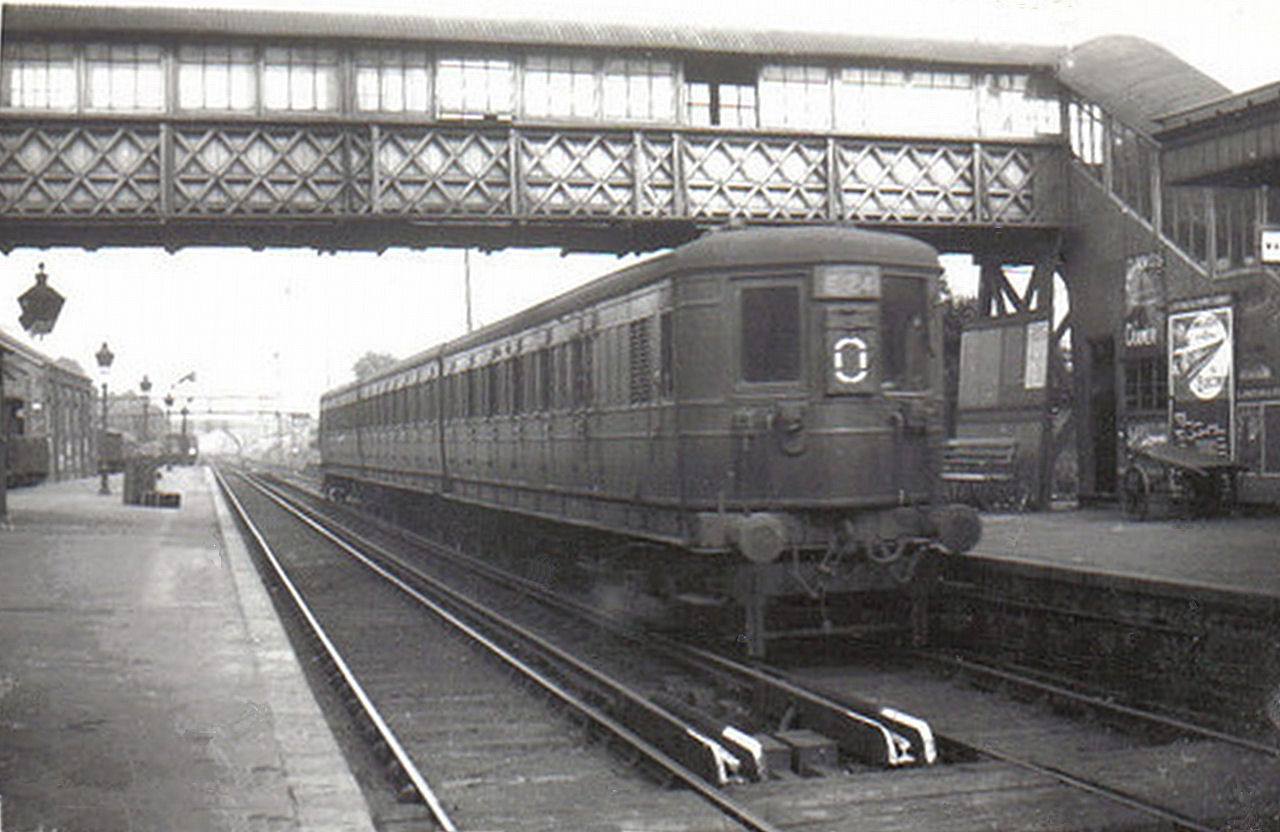
A 3-Sub unit at Hounslow

The proposals of Walker and Jones to electrify the principal suburban lines of the LSWR were adopted by the Board early in 1913. The scheme was to be divided into two stages: stage one was to be Waterloo to Waterloo via both the Kingston and Hounslow loops, the main line out as far as Hampton Court Junction and thence onwards to both Hampton Court and Claygate (a short distance down the Guildford New line, probably intended to provide a turnback location off the main line), the Shepperton branch, and Wimbledon to East Putney and Point Pleasant Junction. This part of the scheme covered 50 route miles (80 route km) and about 150 track miles (240 route km), and it was expected that the work involved would take two years to complete, at an estimated cost of £1.16 million. Stage two was to include all three routes to Guildford, via Epsom, Cobham and Woking, and possibly Twickenham and Hounslow to Windsor.

=== Power supply ===
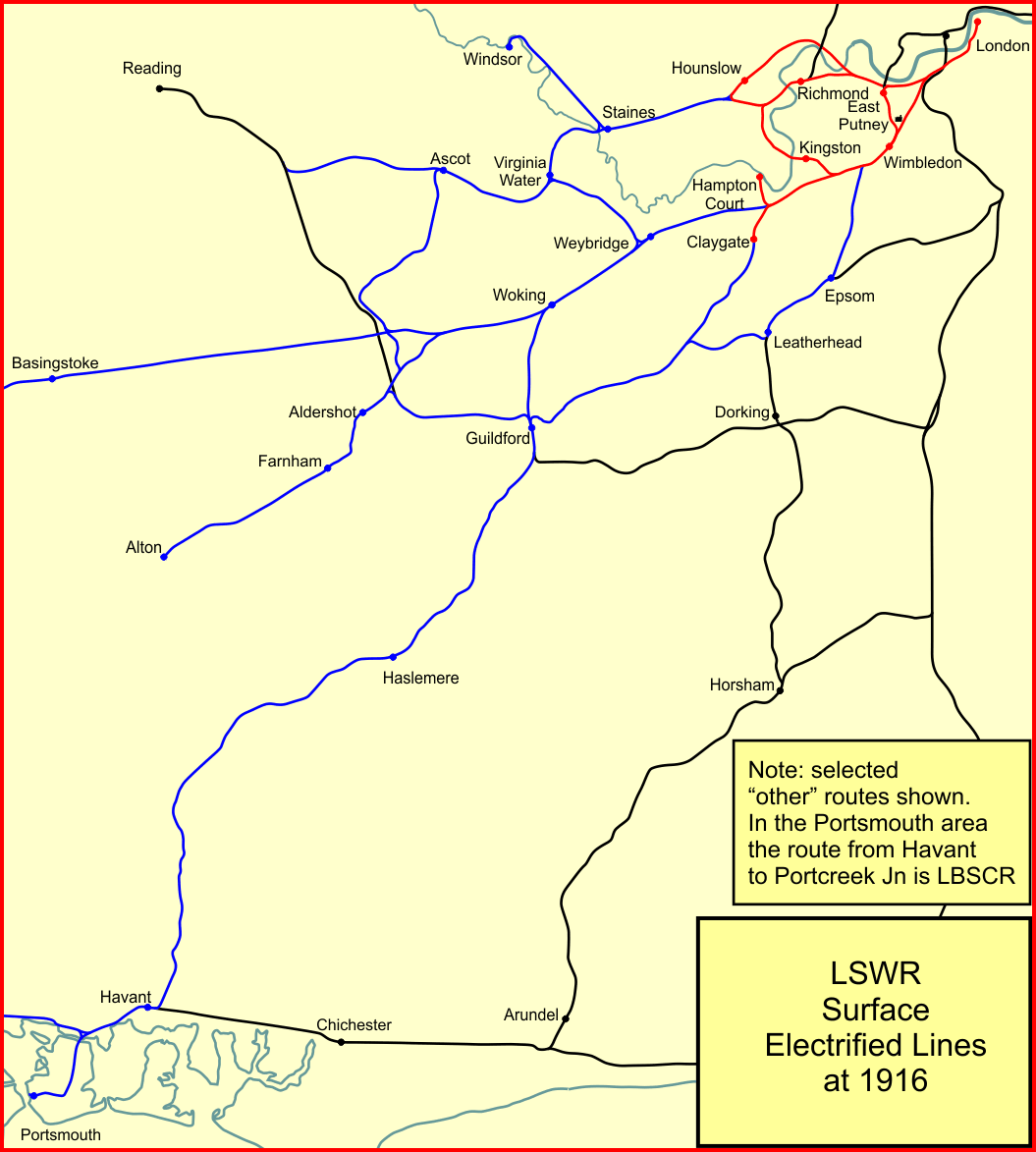
The extent of LSWR electrification in 1916 (in red)

The LSWR built its own power station at Durnsford Road near Wimbledon. Work started immediately in 1913, but was suspended due to the First World War. The power station had 16 Babcock & Wilcox boilers and five 5,000 kW Dick Kerr turbo-alternators, which generated power at 11 kV, three-phase, 25 Hz. Provision was made for a 10,000 kW extension. Three 400 kW turbo-generator sets supplied direct current at 220 V for the switchboard control circuits, for driving the auxiliaries and also for lighting the power house.

From Durnsford Road, power was distributed to nine sub-stations at Waterloo, Clapham Junction, Raynes Park, Kingston, Twickenham, Barnes, Isleworth, Sunbury and Hampton Court Junction. Sub-station equipment included transformers to step down from 11 kV to the line voltage of 600 V, and rotary converters to change to direct current. The rotary converters had to be staffed continuously, a significant expense.

The conductor rail was flat-bottom Vignoles section, of high conductivity steel, 100 lbs per yard (50 kg per metre), laid 3 inches (76 mm) above, and 16 inches (410 mm) outside the running rail, these dimensions being respectively between top of conductor rail and track rail and between centre line of conductor rail and running edge of running rail. Return was by the running rails, bonded with flat copper wire protected by special fishplates. The motors picked up their supply by overrunning shoes placed midway along a beam suspended from the motor bogie axleboxes.

=== First LSWR routes commissioned ===
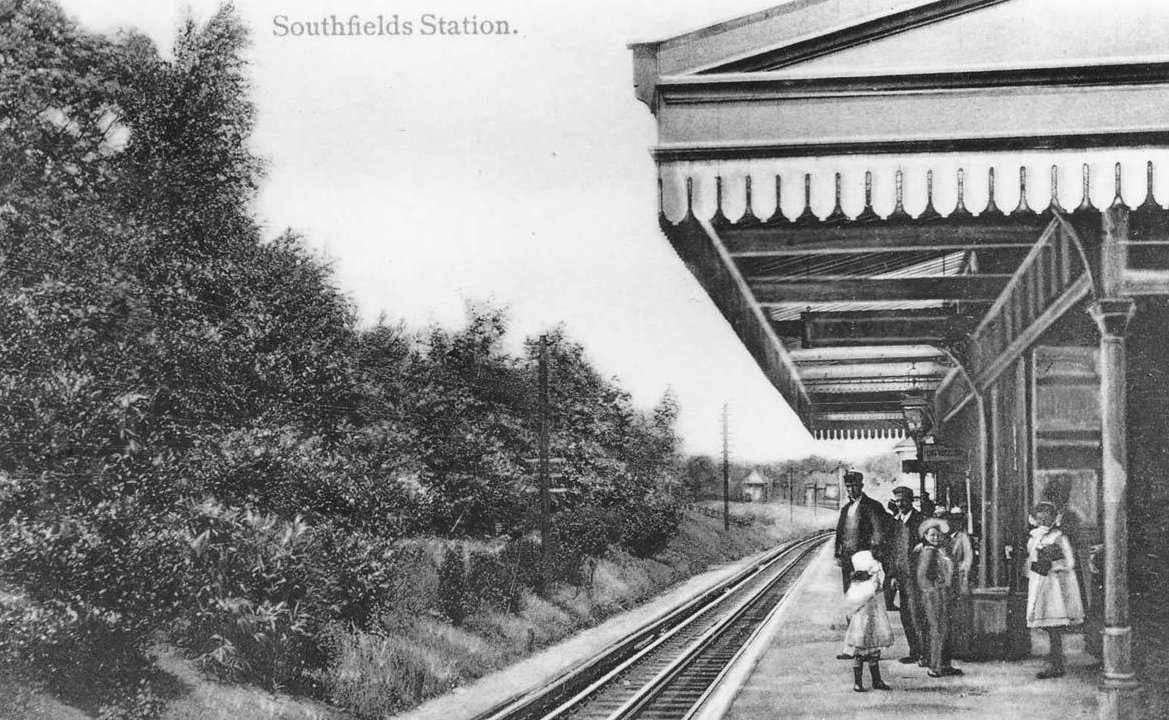
Third and fourth rail at Southfields station

The first line treated was from Waterloo to Wimbledon via East Putney. The line from Putney Bridge to Wimbledon had been jointly built by the LSWR and the Metropolitan District Railway in 1889, and had been electrified by the District in 1905. There was a spur from Point Pleasant Junction on the LSWR Barnes line connecting to East Putney, on the Wimbledon line. The District Railway used 600 V DC, so for compatibility the LSWR adopted that voltage. The District trains used a third and fourth rail, whereas the LSWR trains used a third rail only. To enable interoperability the fourth rail was electrically bonded to the running rails. The LSWR electric operation started on 25 October 1915 on weekdays only. There was a twenty-minute frequency, but patronage was very poor, and the service was soon considerably reduced.

Electric train running started on the Kingston roundabout and Shepperton services from 30 January 1916. The Hounslow Loop started electric trains running on 12 March 1916, followed by the Hampton Court line on 18 June 1916. Finally the section from Hampton Court Junction to Claygate was electrically operational on 20 November 1916.

In 1913 about 25 million passengers had been carried on the lines afterwards electrified. By 1916 it had risen to 29.4 million and by 1920 to 52.6 million.

=== Infrastructure enhancements ===
Infrastructure work in connection with the first stage of the electrification included the provision of eight running lines between Nine Elms and Vauxhall. In addition a flyover with 160 feet (49 m) span was constructed at Hampton Court Junction to take the Down Hampton Court line over the main line; it was approached by a long, gentle climb from Surbiton station. The flyover line was opened to traffic on 14 July 1915. A new station was opened at Barnes Bridge on the Hounslow Loop.

== Coaching stock ==
Most other railways in Britain which had gone in for suburban electrification in the early years of the twentieth century followed American practice by building new rolling stock with saloon accommodation for their electric services. Vehicles of that type provided plenty of standing room in the peaks and adequate seating capacity for slack periods, but were really designed for short distance rapid transit operations, and were considered less suitable for the middle distance suburban services on the LSWR.

At the time when electric traction was first being contemplated for the suburban lines of the London and South Western Railway, in 1912, many of the services on these routes had just been equipped with new coaching stock. Formed into close-coupled four-vehicle "bogie block" sets, which could be used in pairs at busy periods, these coaches had been in production at Eastleigh Works from 1902 until 1912, when the building programme was halted in anticipation of electrification. They were wooden-bodied with a semi-elliptical roof. One of the chief aims of the LSWR electrification scheme was to reduce operating costs, and it would have been uneconomic to scrap steam-hauled suburban coaches. Accordingly, Herbert Walker planned to have the steam-hauled sets converted to electric multiple-unit working, in which the coaches would be permanently coupled together in groups of three, with driving controls and a motor bogie at each end of the unit. Two, three or even four units could be coupled together and driven from the leading cab if a longer train was required, although two units (six coaches) was the maximum originally intended, and on which the projected rolling stock requirement was based.

It was calculated that 84 three-coach units would be required for stage one of the electrification scheme. A specification for the traction equipment was drawn up by the LSWR electrical engineer Herbert Jones, and the contract for its design, manufacture and installation was won by the British Westinghouse Electric and Manufacturing Company Limited of Trafford Park, Manchester, in March 1913. There were also to be eight spare traction motors with gears and cases. Surrey Warner was appointed Carriage and Wagon Superintendent in 1906, and was responsible for the bodywork and mechanical alterations required. Much of this work was carried out by British Westinghouse, who were given shop-floor space at Eastleigh for installation purposes. British Westinghouse became Metropolitan-Vickers Electric Company Limited (Metrovick) late in 1919 following its financial collapse and subsequent rescue.

Their overall length of the three-coach units was 157 feet 5 inches (47.98 m) or 159 feet 5 inches (48.59 m) (depending on whether the trailers were 49 feet (15 m) or 51 feet (16 m) long), and they weighed about 95 long tons. Only first and third class accommodation was provided, the first break with second class on the LSWR, and the number of seats varied from 172 to 190, about a quarter being first class.

A regular interval service was run, with the trains operating to the same timetable in the peaks, only strengthened to six cars (two units) as necessary. The electric services were supplemented in busy hours by a few steam trains from Waterloo to Hounslow via Brentford (fast to Putney) and Shepperton (fast to Mortlake). These steam extras were replaced by electric trains on 31 July 1916, and 2 April 1917, respectively. In 1920, twenty-four 2-coach third class trailer units were provided to work between two of the motor sets, forming an eight-coach train. These units were converted from steam stock and each consisted of one 8-compartment and one 9-compartment coach, close coupled. Half of them were 105 feet (32 m) long, the other half being 107 feet (33 m); the overall width was 8 feet 10 1/2 inches (2.705 m). and the weight 46 long tons. Generally they were similar to the motor sets.

Conventional round side buffers and screw couplings were provided at unit ends, but simple pivot blocks, retained from the 'bogie block' sets, coupled individual vehicles within each unit. The width over body of all the vehicles was 8 feet 0 3/4 inch (2.457 m), increased by 10 inches (250 mm) by the step-boards and commode-handles.

=== Electrical equipment on the train ===
Each unit had two motor coaches with driving controls and a brake van, flanking a non-powered trailer coach. Each motor coach was equipped with a single motor bogie at the cab end, fitted with a pair of 275 horsepower (205 kW) traction motors fixed to brackets supported by the driving wheel axles, an arrangement generally termed axle hung. The motors were designed to the largest dimensions possible given the track gauge and wheel diameter, giving maximum power for rapid acceleration away from station stops and high speeds where appropriate. They were fully enclosed, with a thick casing and fan to ensure adequate heat dissipation; The motors themselves were of the axle-mounted, totally-enclosed box type with an armature fan to ventilate the motor. They were geared 59:21 to driving wheels of nominal 3 feet 6 inches (1.07 m) diameter, with a motor bogie wheelbase of 8 feet 9 inches (2.67 m).

The control of the main circuits was of the British Westinghouse Electric "All-Electric Control" type, with automatic acceleration. In this type the contactors are operated by solenoids, energised from the line voltage and controlled through train lines from the master controller in the driver's cab.

Power was collected from the upper surface of the conductor rail by cast iron collector shoes mounted on wooden beams which were suspended between the axle boxes on each side of the motor bogies. The shoes were five inches (100 mm) wide and the length of shoe in contact with the rail was nine inches (225 mm). They had a small amount of vertical play, and contact with the live rail was maintained purely by gravity. The connecting cable from each shoe ran through a substantial copper fuse, mounted in a spark-arrester box (known as an arc chute) suspended on brackets below the solebar, and then entered the coach body through a slot in the lower side panel above the footboard. A power (bus) line ran externally along the roof of each coach and was joined by flexible cables between vehicles throughout the length of the train, connecting all its collector shoes together.

An eight-core control cable was routed along the roof and linked between vehicles in each unit by flexible jumpers; this connected the control equipment in each motor coach. When the master controller was moved to activate the control system in one cab, the control wires were energised in sequence to send electrical signals at line voltage (600 V DC) to activate the control system at the other end of the unit in an equivalent manner. The control cable could be connected throughout the train when two or more units were coupled, so that all the equipment in the train were controlled from one cab. The system was developed by electrical contractors British Westinghouse and was based on that originally invented in the USA by Frank J. Sprague for tramway operation.

The switchgear, resistances and associated apparatus were housed in a compartment behind the driving cab. It had been decided to locate them here rather than on the underframe partly for ease of access for maintenance, but also because having their mass directly over the motor bogie increased the available adhesion. The resistances generated significant heat, and cooling air was provided through ventilating louvres, with horizontal slatting, in the coach sides. The control gear operated with a loud and ringing series of clicks, quickly giving rise to the epithet nutcrackers being bestowed upon these units.

=== Brakes ===
Westinghouse quick-acting brakes, worked off cylinders 12 by 14 inches (300 by 360 mm) were supplied with compressed air by compressors driven by slow speed motors, one of which was placed under each motor coach, and a master governor and switch ensured that all compressors throughout the train started and stopped simultaneously. This arrangement is known as the Westinghouse governor synchronizing system.

This was used rather than the vacuum brake system, previously standard on LSWR suburban stock, because it allowed faster station stops, necessary given the frequent and tightly timed services planned. The brake and main reservoir pipes were situated at buffer-beam height. Also in the equipment compartment was the air compressor for the air brake, one of which was situated in each motor coach. These compressors operated with a high-pitched 'ping-ping' sound; they were activated by brake application and exhaustion of the air in the system, and could therefore often be heard while the train was standing in a station.

=== Driver's controls ===
The driving controls were designed to require a minimum of skill to operate, so consistent schedules were not dependent on the ability of the motorman. The multiple unit control system was electro-magnetic and featured automatic acceleration using current limiting relays, a new feature at the time. The master controller incorporated a "dead man's handle", nowadays referred to as a "driver's safety device"; downward pressure had to be applied to this at all times while the train was moving, or the brakes would automatically be applied.

Other controls in the cab included a whistle, supplied with air from the brake compressor, and a hand-operated windscreen wiper on the motorman's lookout. A brake pressure gauge and ammeter were also provided but, as with the LBSCR ac stock, no speedometer.

=== Passenger accommodation ===
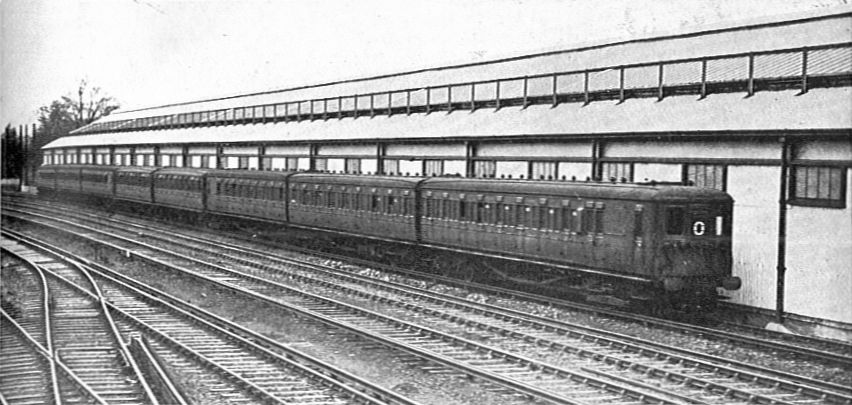
An eight-car train formed of two 3-Sub units and a two car unpowered trailer between; at Orpington

Third-class compartments seated five each side and were 5 feet 6 inches (1.68 m) between partitions, except those downgraded from first or second class which had an extra four or six inches (100 to 150 mm) of legroom, the former being those in the 7553-type 49 ft trailers.

The seats were of the bench type with fixed wire-framed cushions, and upright cushions had headrests. Most were upholstered with red and black tapestry, but a few units had a shiny black 'American cloth', while others had rattan these variations were again probably due to wartime supply difficulties. First class compartments were 6 feet 6 inches (1.98 m) between partitions, seated four each side with end and three intermediate armrests, and were upholstered in blue cloth with loose lift-out cushions.

Heaters were fitted, located under the seats. Each compartment was illuminated by two series-wired 75 V 40 W lamps in opal-glass bowls, the pattern differing in the two classes. Both heating and lighting worked at line-voltage, and the lighting circuits were originally controlled independently in each vehicle. There was no cab lighting, so at night the motorman had to open the rear of the illuminated headcode box to read his notices.

In order to give the electric services a new and modern image, the three-coach units were painted in a different livery from the salmon pink and brown of the steam trains they superseded. It is probable that the choice of shade was influenced by Herbert Jones' visit to the USA in 1912. The basic colour was sage green, lined out in black and yellow and with mid-brown window mouldings.

== After World War I ==
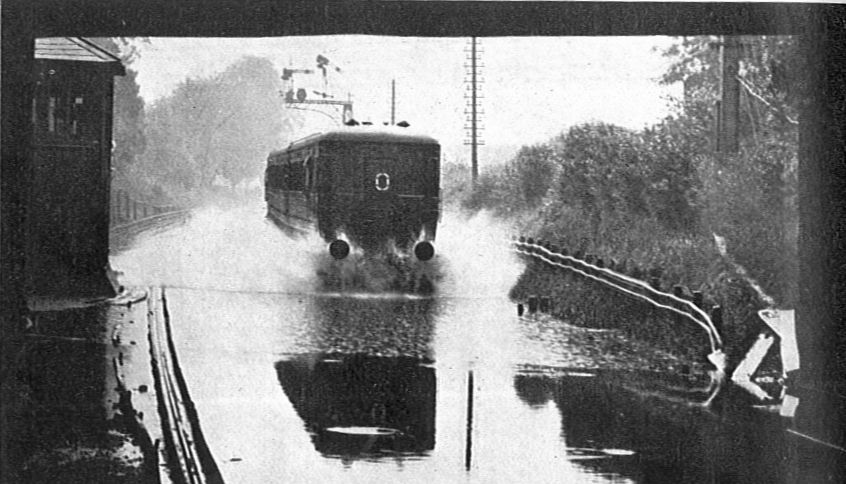
Negotiating floods at Kew Bridge

The First World War stalled the intended extension of the LSWR electrified network, as all available manpower was diverted to the armed forces. The railways were subject to Government control through the Railway Executive Committee, which concentrated on responding to the war effort, and strategic issues were delayed. A significant relocation of the population took place as Londoners transferred to homes in the south-western outer suburbs to escape enemy air raids. After the Armistice this led to serious overcrowding on outer suburban services, and it was decided to build two-car trailer units by converting steam stock, so that electric trains could be strengthened to eight in the peak by inserting a two-car trailer between two 3-car units. There was plenty of power available for the purpose, although shunting the dumb units out off peak and back in later was complicated as they had neither power nor driving compartments.

=== Stage two deferred ===
Stage two of the electrification had been deferred during the war, and in 1920 the LSWR reviewed the planned electrification to Guildford via Epsom and via Cobham, but found that contractors were unable to submit reliable tenders at reasonable prices, so further work was postponed. The planned flyover for the Up Guildford lines at Woking Junction was never constructed, although it had been a definite component of the original electrification project.

== Southern Railway ==
In 1923 most of the railway companies of Great Britain were reorganised into one or other of four new, large companies, in a process known as the Grouping, following the Railways Act 1921. The LSWR was a constituent of the new Southern Railway, as were the LBSCR and the South Eastern and Chatham Railway (SE&CR).

After some negotiation, Sir Herbert Walker of the LSWR was appointed General Manager of the Southern Railway. He had been knighted for services during the period of Government control, on 13 January 1915.) Richard Maunsell of the SE&CR was appointed Chief Mechanical Engineer, and he brought his Chief Draughtsman, Lionel Lynes, who set up office at Eastleigh Works which became the main SR carriage and wagon establishment. Lynes played a dominant role in the design of the electric coaching stock subsequently built by the SR.

Herbert Jones from the LSWR was appointed to the post of Electrical Engineer but following completion of the 1925 Western section electrification to Guildford and Dorking, he was effectively in charge only of day-to-day running and maintenance of the rolling stock and electrification fixed apparatus such as substations. Responsibility for the electrical design of the SR electric rolling stock fleet was given to Alfred Raworth from the SECR.

=== Southern Railway Selection of a standard system ===
The LBSCR had its 6.6 kV overhead system, which it was committed to extending to Coulsdon and Wallington, and to a main line scheme to the south coast. The SE&CR had decided on a 3 kV 25 Hz overhead system. In 1922 a provisional committee of the future Southern Railway met to determine policy; each of the constituents wished to pursue its earlier intentions, possibly imposing their system on the other two. The committee had no executive power, and the SE&CR in particular refused to accept the restraints imposed by it. A respected American specialist associated with the Pennsylvania Railroad, George Gibbs, was brought in to arbitrate. Although his recommendations for the immediate future were acceptable, he suggested that future main line electrification on the LBSCR and SE&CR systems should be at 11 kV overhead, as on the Pennsylvania system: this brought a fourth system temporarily on to the agenda.

In practical terms, however, the LSWR system was adopted except for some extensions of the existing LBSCR network. The line voltage of the LSWR system might be increased to 750 V, but for the sake of uniformity 600 V was decided on for the time being in February 1923.

=== End of the LBSCR overhead system ===
In July 1926 a start was made in converting the former LBSCR overhead system to third-rail operation. It had been found that the maintenance costs of the AC stock considerably exceeded those for the DC motor coaches by then in service. The last AC powered passenger train on the Southern Railway left Victoria for Coulsdon North at 12:10 am on Sunday 22 September 1929.

=== Resuming the pre-war electrification scheme ===
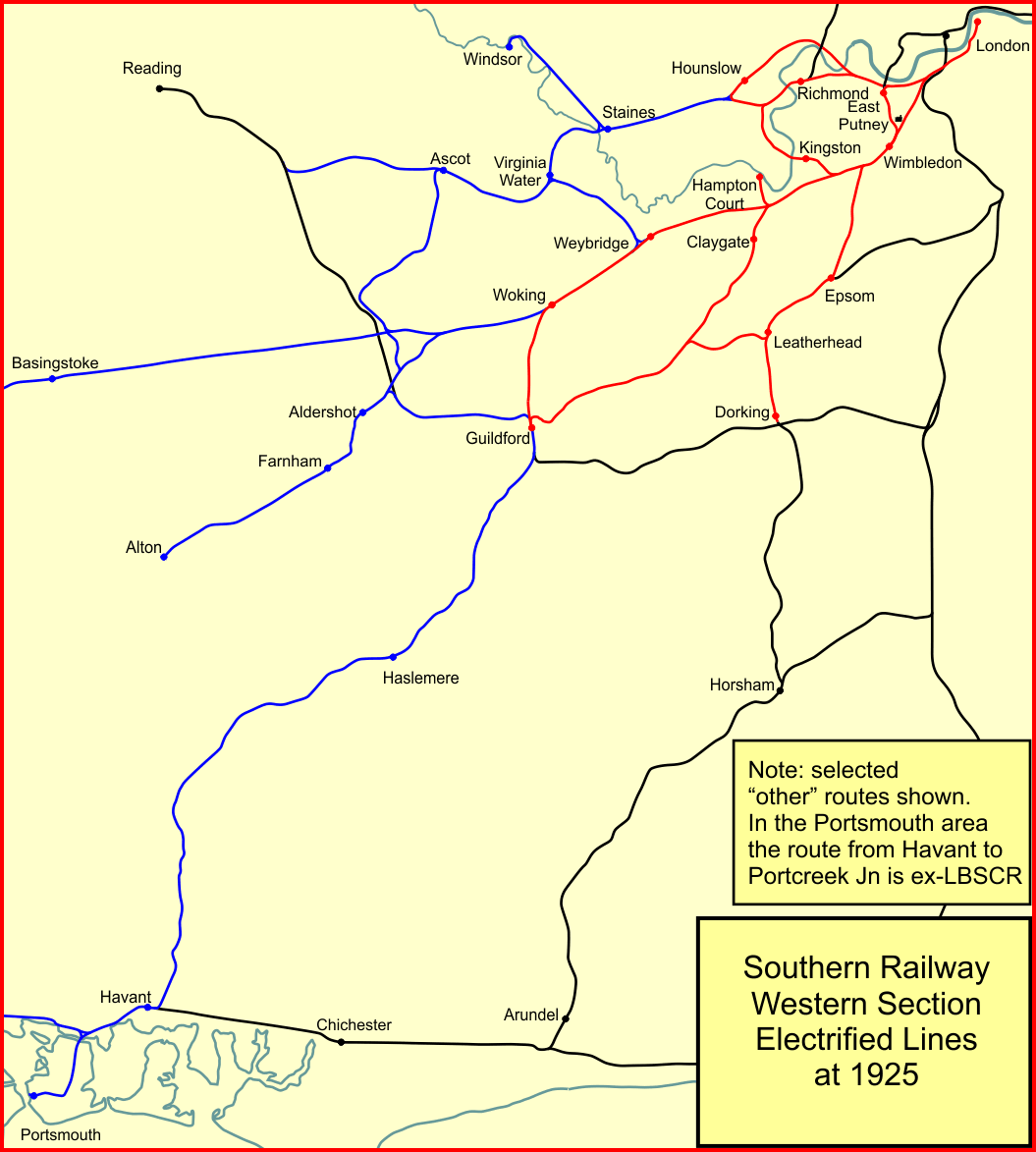
Electrified routes on the Western section of the Southern Railway in 1925 (in red)

Before 1914 it had been a definite plan to electrify the three routes to Guildford, via Epsom, Claygate and Woking; the scheme was interrupted by World War I. On 6 December 1923 the Southern Railway Board approved resumption of the scheme, now including the former LBSCR section to Dorking. The project covered 33 route miles, 53 route km (67 track miles, 108 track km) and would cost £833,000.

=== Power supply and trackworks ===
The former LSWR generating plant at Durnsford Road provided the electricity for this scheme at 11 KV 25 Hz three-phase AC. This was carried by lineside cabling to seven substations equipped with rotary converters, which were supplied by British Thomson-Houston. The substations supplied current at a nominal 600 V DC to the conductor rails. New bay platforms for terminating electric services were provided on the Down sides at both Guildford and Dorking. Where necessary, platforms at most other stations were extended to the new standard of 520 feet (160 m) which allowed for an eight-coach rush-hour electric train. The platforms at Horsley, Clandon and London Road (Guildford) were not lengthened at this time. A new station was provided at Motspur Park, between Raynes Park and Worcester Park on the Epsom line.

=== Start of new Guildford services ===
Public services on these routes started on 12 July 1925, following a formal opening ceremony on 9 July at both Guildford and Dorking. The new regular-interval timetables replaced steam services running to irregular timings. They were designed to make maximum use of the local lines out of Waterloo, and to distribute stops in the inner area in an effort to reduce overcrowding. At first there was a twenty-minute interval service on both the Cobham and Epsom lines.

On the Cobham line all trains ran through to Guildford; on the Epsom line a half-hourly service ran to Dorking and one every hour to Effingham Junction, connecting there with Cobham line trains in both directions. There were complaints that connections to Kingston were awkward; Kingston was a major shopping centre and generated considerable off-peak traffic. As a result the service was entirely recast as from 1 December 1925. The Cobham line trains were rerouted onto the through (fast) lines non-stop from Waterloo to Surbiton, leading to the first regular operation of suburban electric multiple units at express speeds. This then allowed Epsom line trains to be retimed to give better connections in and out of Shepperton and Kingston loop trains at Raynes Park.

Both Epsom and Leatherhead suffered from having separate former LBSCR and LSWR stations. Leatherhead was dealt by the construction of a new spur from the south end of the LBSCR Dorking line platforms to the Effingham Junction line. All trains now used the LBSCR station and the former LSWR establishment was closed from 10 July 1927. Sorting out the Epsom duplication had to wait for the Central section electrification in 1929.

Platforms at Horsley, Clandon and London Road had not been extended to the standard 520 ft, and in the peak, 8-car trains had to be operated by the original LSWR and 1925 Western section types, which were shorter. The platforms at these three stations were therefore belatedly lengthened in about 1938.

== Windsor electrification ==
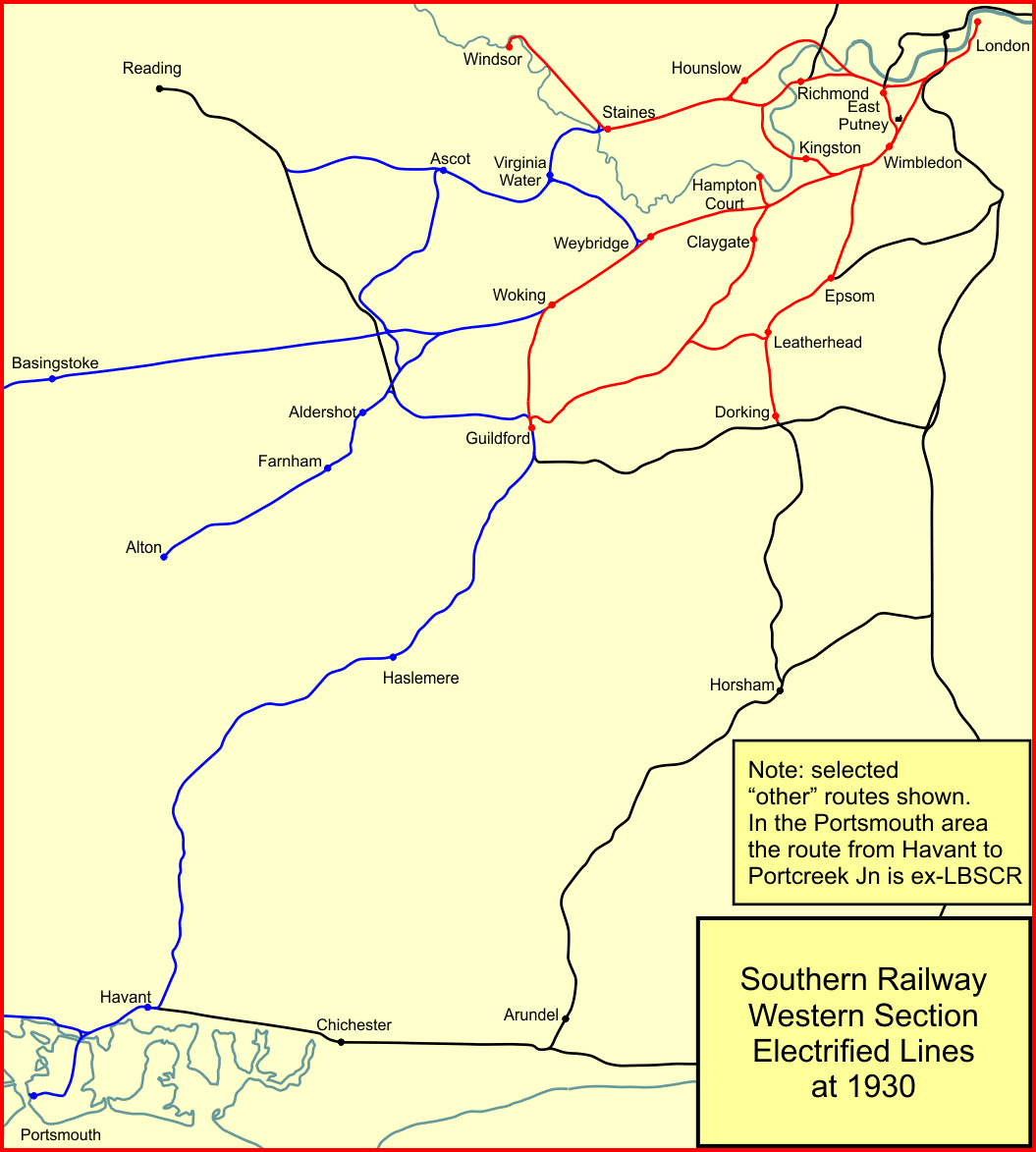
Electrified routes on the Western section of the Southern Railway in 1930 (in red)

Electrification of the inner and middle-distance suburban lines of the Southern Railway was effectively completed following authorisation of three small schemes covering the Feltham Junction/Hounslow Junction to Windsor routes, part of a project including Central and Eastern section routes, at a total cost of £600,000. Electric services started on 6 July 1930.

The Windsor line extension comprised fifteen route miles and was authorised by the SR Board in May 1929; it took only fourteen months to complete. Power was supplied from Durnsford Road to new rotary converter substations at Ashford and Datchet. Two new stations were provided, at North Sheen, with a 520 foot (160 m) island platform, and Whitton was more conventional, with side platforms. Additional rolling stock comprised twelve three-coach motor units and six extra two-coach trailer sets.

The new electric service comprised a half-hourly off-peak frequency between Waterloo and Windsor, non-stop between Waterloo and Richmond and then all stations. This was increased to three per hour in the peaks, one running via Hounslow with Feltham as the first stop out of London.

== Waterloo area track alterations ==
By the mid 1930s the working of Waterloo station and its approaches was beginning to overwhelm the operational capacity. The signalling and track layout mostly dated from before 1900, and used Sykes Lock and Block system. The Up Main Local Line was on the north side of the four main line (from Wimbledon etc) tracks and all arriving suburban trains had to cross all the lines to arrive on the suburban side of the station. Traffic was forecast to increase greatly, and replacement of the existing signalling and major alterations to the track layout became vitally necessary. A £500,000 scheme was announced in January 1935, covering the main line out as far as Hampton Court Junction and the Windsor line as far as Clapham Junction. Work commenced almost immediately.

The plan was to transfer the Up Local Line to the south of the Up and Down Through Lines, so that suburban trains had an adjacent pair of tracks leading to the suburban side of the station. A viaduct was required to carry the approaching Up Local Line over the Through Lines, and the closest location to Waterloo that was suitable was at Durnsford Road, near Wimbledon. A concrete structure was provided, climbing at 1 in 60 and descending at 1 in 45. In addition a new Up Through Relief line was provided from Vauxhall to Waterloo, to deal with the slow approach of arriving main line and empty stock trains. One of the four Windsor line tracks was sacrificed to enable this.

The entire route out from Waterloo as far as Hampton Court Junction on the main line was equipped with colourlight signalling equipment, supplied by Westinghouse. The new signalling was designed to give a two-minute headway on the main through lines out of Waterloo, increased slightly to two and a half on the local and Windsor lines. Ten signal boxes were abolished, including five between Waterloo and Loco. Junction, and eight others retained with lever-frames adapted to control the new signals. The overhead West London Junction and Clapham Junction A boxes were given new electrically-interlocked frames, but pneumatic operation of points was retained.

From 1:00 am until 7:00 am on Sunday 17 May 1936 the entire main line from Surbiton to Waterloo was closed to enable the rearranged lines, flyover and most of the new signalling to be brought into service. The final part of the scheme involved the resignalling of the Waterloo station area itself, the changeover from semaphores to colour lights taking place at about 1:00 am on Sunday 18 October.

The increased number of train paths available enabled an improved weekday service from 5 July 1936. The Waterloo–Epsom–Effingham Junction and Dorking services were altered to run fast to Wimbledon, then Motspur Park and all stations. The inner stations were served by a new all-stations service between Waterloo and Motspur Park, running every twenty minutes, which reversed using a spur forming the first train length of the new Chessington branch then under construction.

== Chessington Branch ==
Due to the combination of tramway services and the efficient Southern Railway electric suburban trains, housing developed intensively along and south of the LSWR main line. Chessington and the surrounding district was particularly heavily developed. In 1929 the Southern Railway Board agreed to build a new railway through the area. It would run from Motspur Park station through Chessington to Leatherhead, forming a loop line. The construction could get Government financial assistance under the 1929 Development (Loan Guarantee and Grants) Act, which assisted transport companies with schemes likely to help in the relief of unemployment. The Parliamentary bill was given an accelerated passage through Parliament, and received the Royal Assent on 1 August 1930. Land acquisition proved difficult, not least because future housing development would be lucrative to existing land-owners, due to the railway improvements.

In April 1934, although not all the necessary land had yet been purchased, it was decided to make a start. A branch from Motspur Park, over a length of 4 1/2 miles (6.4 km) with four stations and two goods yards would be constructed, at an estimated cost of £560,700, excluding land. Side platforms 540 feet (160 m) in length were provided, and the buildings were constructed in a distinctive modernistic style. Towers for luggage lifts to the platforms were erected, but the lifts themselves were never installed in them. The most unusual feature of the stations was the 200 feet (61 m) cantilevered canopies constructed entirely from pre-cast concrete components: built to the 'Chisarc' design, they arched gracefully over each platform without any obstructing support columns. A single substation, located at Tolworth, was adequate to power the entire branch, and was initially equipped with rotary converter equipment recovered from Leatherhead. The goods yard at Tolworth was on the Down side and initially had four sidings, but an additional three were added in 1940 after which it could accommodate 218 wagons. That at Chessington South was beyond the platforms alongside the alignment of the proposed route to Leatherhead, and had three sidings.

The first section of the Chessington branch, from Motspur Park to Tolworth, a distance of two and a quarter mile stretch from the junction at commenced operation on 29 May 1938, with a twenty-minute interval service to Waterloo, seven days a week. The advanced age of much of the rolling stock used did not match the futuristic stations, but the line nevertheless built up a healthy trade, although much of this traffic was extracted from existing nearby stations at Worcester Park and Stoneleigh. A year to the day after the first section opened, through services to Chessington North and South commenced on 28 May 1939. The 14 miles (23 km) trip from the terminus to Waterloo calling at all stations took just over half an hour.

At Chessington South only the Down platform was completed, and all passenger trains used only that platform. Only the basic platform surface and 'Chisarc' canopy were finished on the Up side, and the track was used for carriage stabling outside the rush hours. There was no passenger access to this platform, as the intended footbridge was never started. Beyond the station electrified double track was continued through the goods yard and on for a further quarter mile.

== Portsmouth Direct Line ==
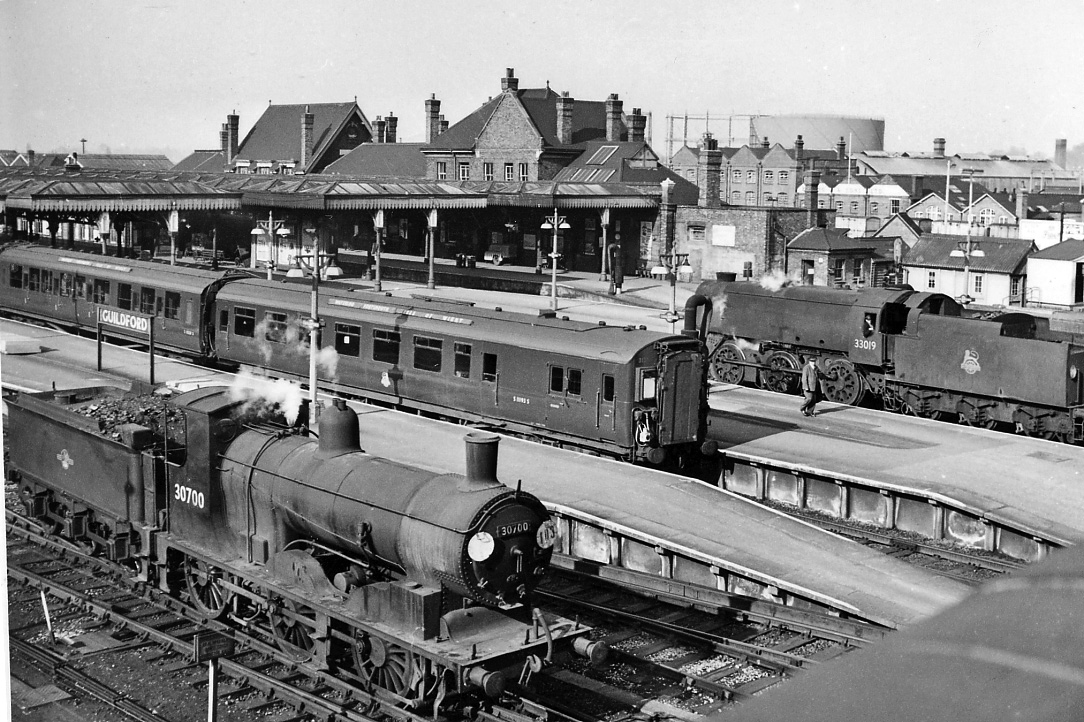
An express unit at Guildford in 1958

The gratifying financial results from the electrification of the Brighton main line encouraged Sir Herbert Walker to consider the next main line scheme: this was to be the Portsmouth Direct Line, from Waterloo to Portsmouth via Guildford. It was a difficult route for steam traction and well suited to electric operation; in addition it attracted a great deal of holiday business to the Isle of Wight, to Hayling Island and Southsea, and there were prosperous communities on the line that might be expected to foster business and residential travel.

The project would electrify from Hampton Court Junction to Portsmouth, and also from Woking to Farnham (later extended to Alton) and Weybridge to Virginia Water and Staines, linking with the Windsor line there. The Railways (Agreement) Act of 1935 would provide low-interest financing. The Portsmouth Direct line electrification, later designated the Portsmouth No 1 Electrification, was to cost about £3 million. The final route to be done was 95 miles (153 km) long, giving a track mileage of 242 miles (389 km). It was authorised on 27 June 1935.

This scheme was notable for the rapidity of its execution. Full electric working between Staines and Weybridge was in place from 3 January 1937 and on the same day temporary services to steam train timings started from Waterloo to Guildford and Farnham. Trial trains right through to Portsmouth harbour ran from 11 April 1937 and on Sunday 20 May twenty 12-coach electric specials worked between Waterloo and Portsmouth Harbour in connection with the Royal Naval Review, in addition to the ordinary steam service. Full public services from Waterloo to Alton and Portsmouth started on 4 July 1937. The basic service on weekdays provided 3 trains an hour on the Portsmouth line and two on the Alton line. One of the three Portsmouth hourly trains called at Guildford and Haslemere only. A rebuilding at Woking was carried out in 1936 to 1939 to give the station 820 feet (250 m) platforms on all four tracks, and the scheme included extension of platforms at Guildford and Haslemere to the same length to take the 12 car trains.

=== Power supply and infrastructure ===
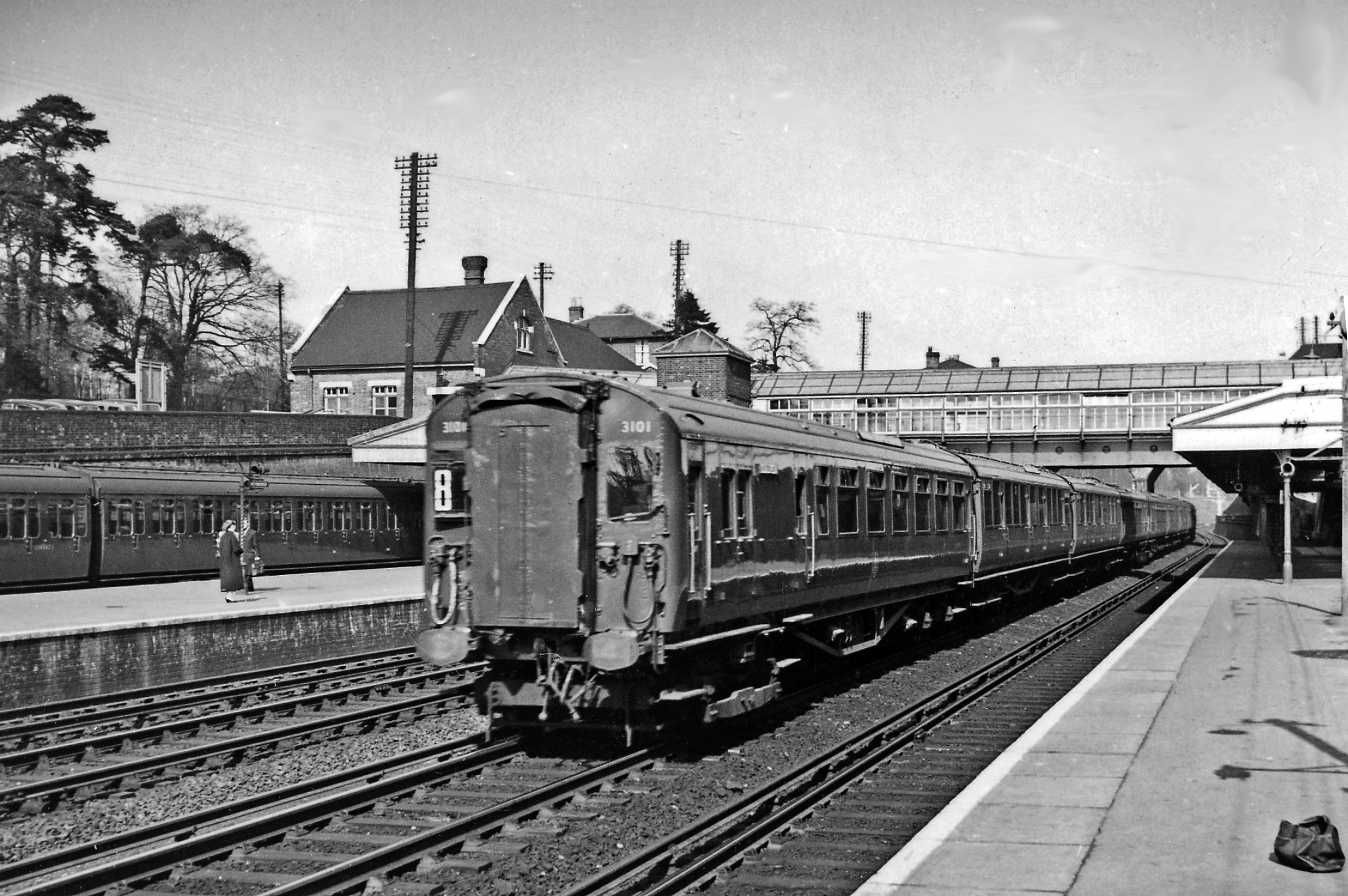
A Portsmouth express passing Weybridge station

Twenty-six sub-stations in all were built for the Portsmouth and Alton lines, and at the height of the work equipment for three substations at a time was unloaded on site every month. The equipment was worked down in steam trains of special wagons, and unloading took place mainly between 11 p.m. Sunday night and 4.30 a.m. next morning. Power was taken from National Grid sub-stations at Byfleet and Portsmouth. A new 12,500 kW turbo-alternator replaced one of the existing 5,000 kW machines at Durnsford Road, to help provide power for the additional electric operation in the London area.

At the southern end of the line, the main civil engineering tasks were the reconstruction of the junction station at Havant, where the Portsmouth Direct line and coastal routes joined, and enlargement of Portsmouth Harbour terminus. In the case of Havant, the new track layout comprised two through lines, off which there were loops serving 800 ft Up and Down side platforms. A bay for the Hayling Island branch trains was located at the London end of the Down platform.

=== Carriage fleet ===
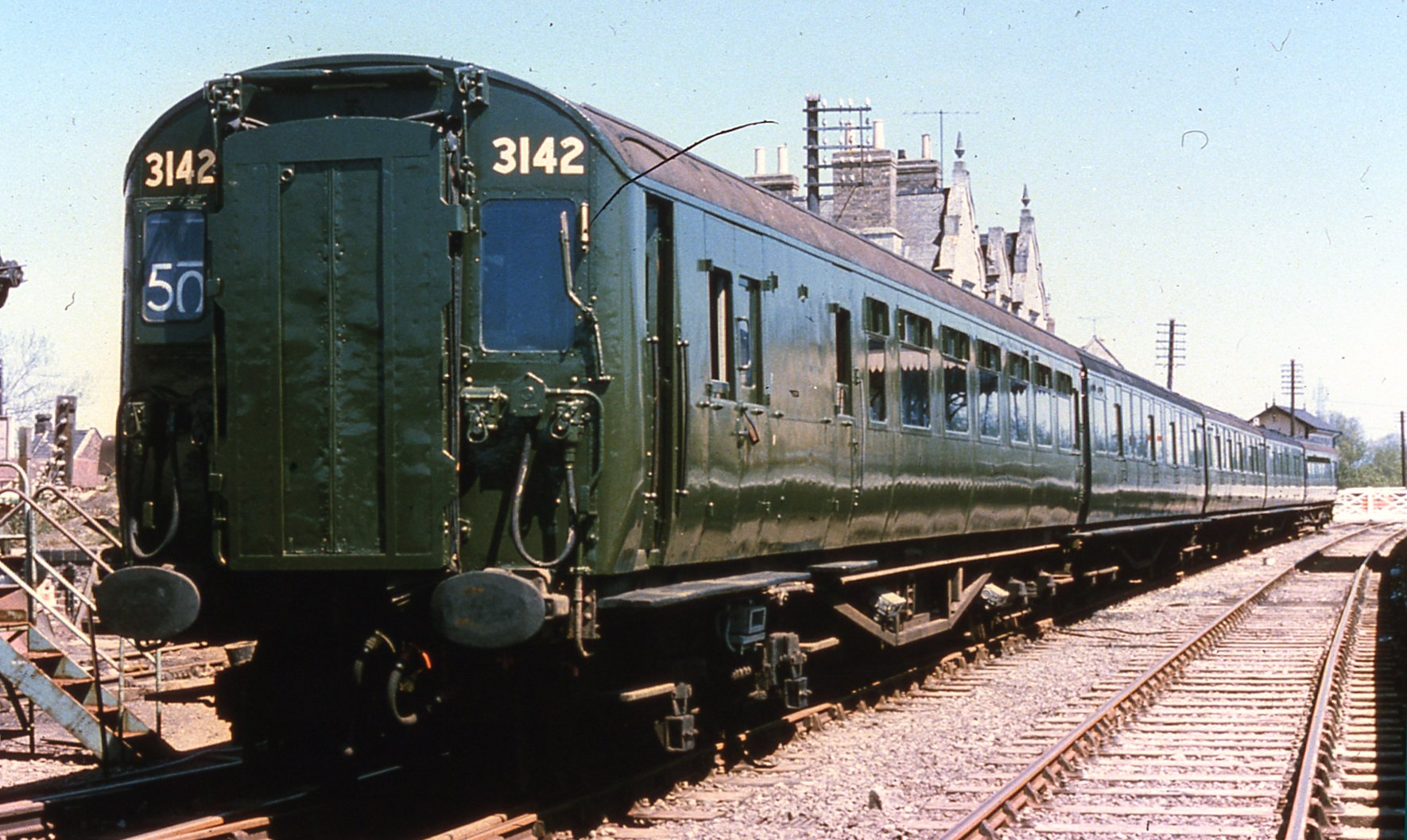
A 4-COR Portsmouth express unit, now preserved

To operate the new services 312 new or rebuilt vehicles were put into use. The semi-fast services were worked by two-car corridor sets with lavatories, the express services by four-car units, corridored throughout, including from one unit to the next. The total of 312 vehicles was made up from five 2-car trailer sets, six 3-car motor sets, eight 2-car motor sets, thirty-eight 2-car motor corridor sets, twenty-nine 4-car corridor sets, nineteen 4-car corridor sets with restaurant cars. The motor coaches of the express units had two 225 horsepower (168 kW) motors, and there were two motor coaches per 4-coach unit, giving a total power of 900 horsepower (670 kW).

The bodies of the new cars had hard wood framing with exterior panels of galvanised steel, and the motor coaches were of the open saloon type. There were two distinct types of four-car units in use. The first made up a unit 264 ft 5 3/4 in (80.60 m) long overall, formation thus: third–class motor saloon brake, 52 seats; corridor composite, 30 first and 24 third–class seats; corridor third, 68 seats; motor saloon brake as above. In the second type a third–class restaurant and kitchen car, 36 seats; composite with restaurant in a small saloon occupying about one-third of the coach and marshalled nearest the kitchen of the adjoining restaurant car, 42 seats, of which 12 were for diners, was substituted for the two centre trailers.

Ordinarily a twelve-car train was made up from two units of type 1 and one of type 2, usually in the centre, with a total power of 3,300 horsepower (2,500 kW). The restaurant cars were air conditioned with equipment located on the underframes of the car. Individual chairs and lift-up tables were provided, and the kitchen was all electric, receiving its supply for cooking from the 660 V traction circuit and the remainder for grills, hot-plate and refrigerator, from the low-tension side of a 660/220 V dynamotor.

== Reading and Camberley ==
The Reading and Camberley electrification was a small project carried out under the 1935 financial arrangements covering 88 track miles (142 track km) of the lines from Virginia Water to Reading, Ascot to Ash Vale, Frimley Junction to Sturt Lane Junction, and over the main line to Pirbright Junction, and Aldershot North Junction to Guildford. It came into use on 1 January 1939. From Frimley Junction to Ash Vale was single line, controlled by electric train tablet, and from Sturt Lane Junction to Pirbright Junction only the local lines were equipped with conductor rails. The cost was about £1 million. The electrical equipment was of the usual type: high tension AC was taken from the central electricity board substation at Reading and distributed to ten rectifier substations, six situated between Virginia Water and Reading and three between Ascot and Ash Vale, and one between Aldershot North Junction and Guildford, all of which were operated from an extended Woking control room.

The platforms at a number of stations were lengthened to 540 feet (160 m) and the alterations at Virginia Water necessitated the construction of a new goods yard. The layout at Ascot provided separate platforms for the Reading and Camberley line trains, and as it was intended to run combined trains for these routes, dividing at Ascot, a double line connection between them was provided at the western end of the station, with a new glasshouse signal cabin. These alterations came into use on 16 October 1938. Berthing sidings were provided at Reading. Live rail was laid between Frimley Junction and Sturt Lane Junction West as a precaution against overruns, and the west curves at Staines and Virginia Water were electrified for use as required.

Trial trains began to run on 30 October 1938 and after a formal opening on 30 December public services commenced on 1 January 1939. The new train service was simple: every 20 minutes in weekday busy hours and every half hour at other times and on Sundays except for a few variations in early morning and late evening trains ran fast to Staines. The trains generally divided at Ascot, the front part running to Reading, reached in 75 minutes and the rear part to Guildford via Camberley, reversing at Aldershot. The new timetable gave an 85% increase in the number of trains. The traffic to Ascot races was first handed by electric trains on 13 June 1939.

== 1939–1947: World War II and after ==
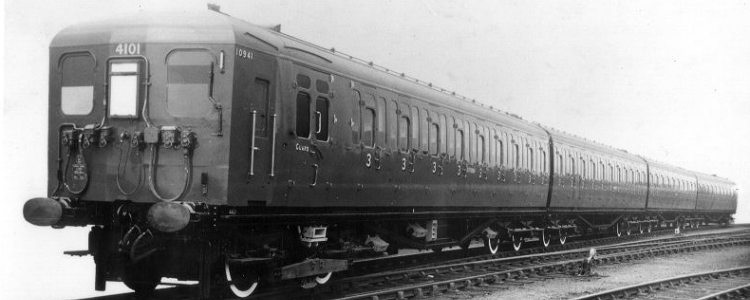
The first new generation suburban train of 1941

During World War II the Southern Railway was heavily committed to the movement of troops, naval personnel and military machinery and supplies to the south coast ports. This intensified particularly in the preparations for the Normandy landings (D-day). At the same time many personnel had joined the armed services, and in addition supplies for repairs to damage from enemy action, and for ordinary maintenance, were in short supply. The railway became seriously run down. Passenger service reductions took place in response, and optional travel was discouraged. After the cessation of hostilities, materials for recovering former levels of efficiency continued to be scarce, and for several years there was a serious shortage of steel, and incidentally locomotive coal, and electricity cuts were commonplace.

In October 1946 the Southern Railway announced plans for major capital works, in particular the electrification of nearly all passenger train operation east of a line from Portsmouth and Reading, with diesel haulage of freight trains and some limited minor passenger routes.

== 1948–present: British Rail and privatisation ==
In the years following the end of the war, Eric Gore-Brown, now the Chairman of the Southern Railway, produced a report of a committee of the four railway companies' chairmen. This report seemed to acquiesce in the continuation of some form of wartime overall control of the railways and co-ordination with road transport. This was the philosophy of many political interests at the time, although it was unwelcome to many senior railway officers. Gore-Brown's report was kept quiet, but the Transport Act 1947 was passed, forcing national ownership on the railways; this took effect on the first day of 1948.

The Southern Railway's operation passed to the nationalised British Railways, Southern Region. The third rail system developed by the LSWR was installed on a widespread basis on the former LBSCR and SE&CR lines. and it was extended in the 1960s to include Bournemouth. In 2003 Network Rail stated that of the total network of 30,764 km (19,116 miles), about 11,900 km (7,400 miles) were electrified, of which 4,285 km (2,663 miles) were third rail, in the former Southern Railway area.

The Office of Rail Regulation (now the Office of Rail and Road has issued a policy of a presumption against new and extended third rail electrification.

In 2013 a study was published, that estimated the transmission losses of DC electrification systems. DC systems operate at low voltage and high current, and lost power consumption is expected to be higher than high voltage systems. The study determined that the appropriate level of uplift to be charged was 17%. Some train operators meter their power usage which was supplied by Network Rail (from external generators); the metering is done on the trains, and the uplift relates to power consumption in getting the power from the external supply to the train. It is mostly caused by so-called I^{2}R losses in transmission cabling.
