= Park Lane Stables Teddington =

Historic Stables in Teddington, London UK

Coordinates: 51.424006°N 0.337472°W

- Interactive map of the Park Lane Stables Teddington area

Park Lane Stables are stables in Teddington, London Borough of Richmond upon Thames built around 1830 and originally developed as a fire station when fire engines were horse-drawn. Today the stables are run as a charity, Park Lane Stables RDA, which is a member of the Riding for the Disabled Association. The charity provides riding, carriage driving and therapy sessions for those with disabilities or who have a need for access to equine-based therapy. Park Lane Stables is also a pony club centre.

== History ==
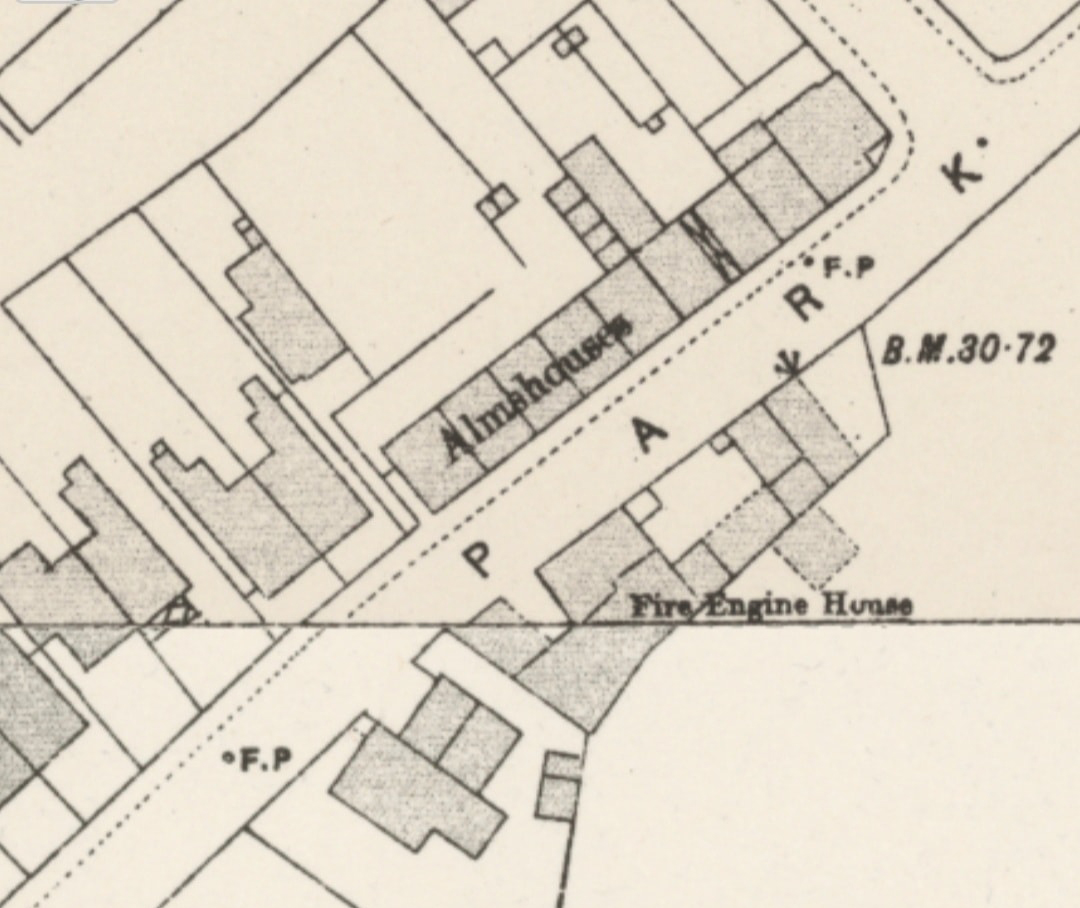
Ordnance Survey 1894 map which shows the stables mentioned as 'fire engine house' when the fire engines were horse drawn. Reproduced with the permission of the National Library of Scotland

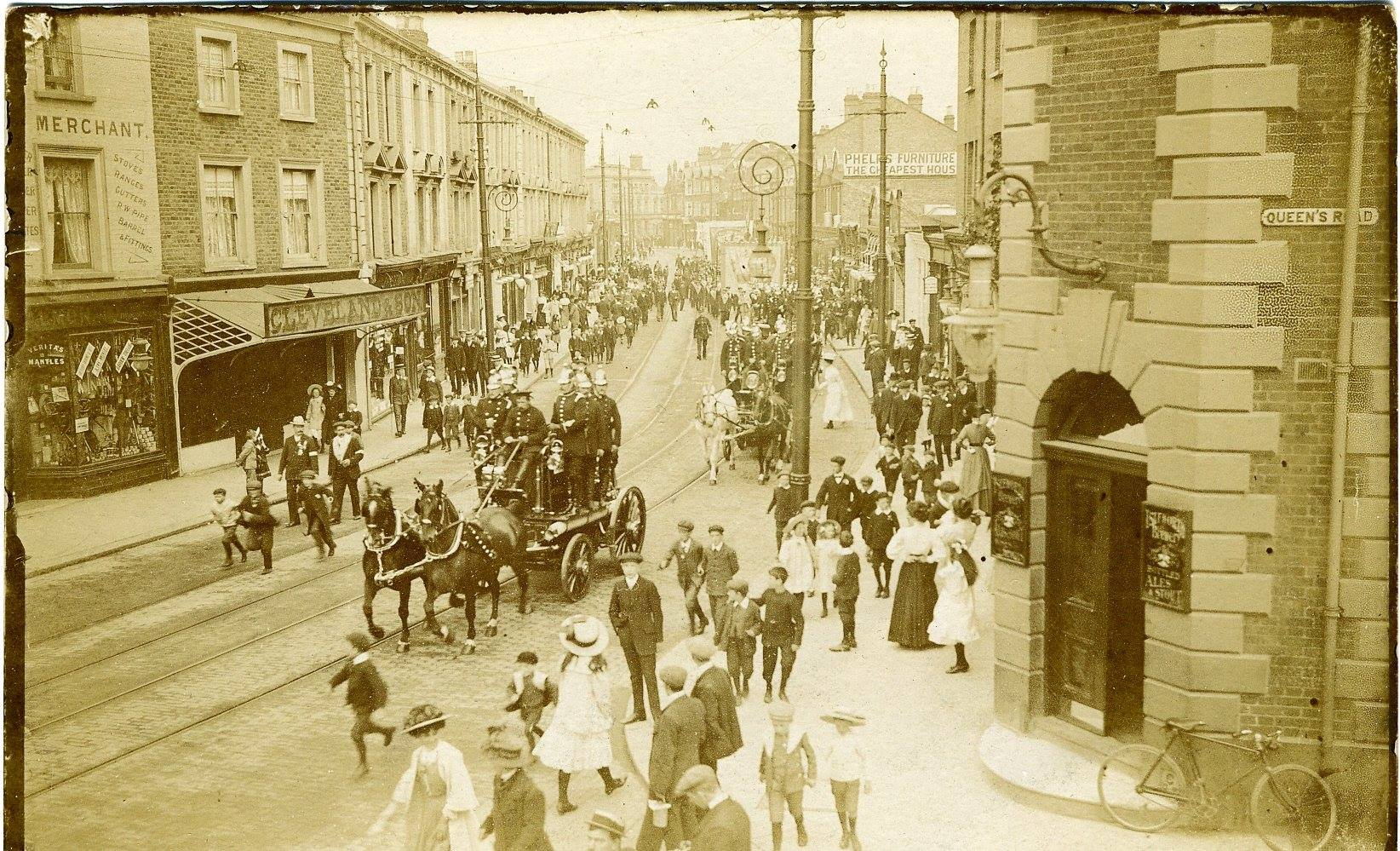
Fire Brigade parade in Teddington in the early 1900s

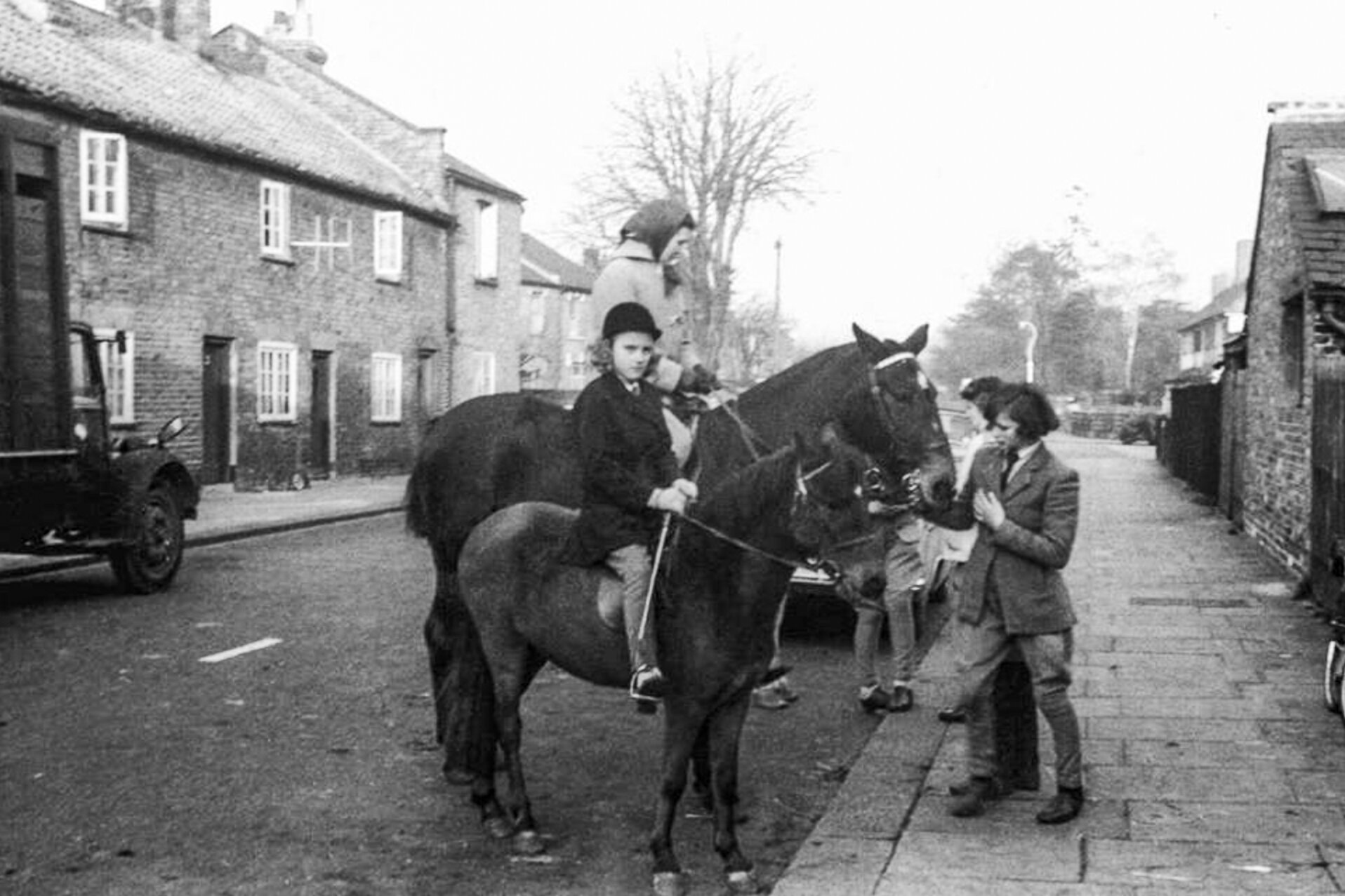
Park Lane in the 1950s

=== 19th century ===
The stables were built to house a fire station around 1830 by the Abbot of Westminster in what was then known as Alms House Road, on account of the almshouses in the street opposite the stables.

In 1831 a parish fire engine was purchased and put in the care of the beadle, a caretaker employed by the Abbot of Westminster. In 1837 the Abbot gave up the land and ownership turned to the local civic parish council.

=== 20th century ===
In the 1901 census the stables are described as 'Council Stables, Engine House [and] Council Yard', belonging to the civil parish.

In 1950 Keith Luxford leased the stables from the council to start a riding school which became known locally as the 'Children's Riding School'. In the late 1950s the stables were taken over by Peter Churchill who ran horsemanship night courses and a riding school. By 1963 the stables were run by John Quinn. In 1989 ownership passed to Mr and Mrs P Dailly who continued to operate the riding school as 'Park Lane Stables'.

=== 21st century ===
As a result of foot and mouth disease in 2001 and the closure of local parks, the stables were forced to shut; they remained so until 2008 when Natalie O'Rourke MBE took over management and subsequently founded Park Lane Stables RDA as a registered charity. In 2016, after their refurbishment, HRH Princess Anne re-opened the stables in her capacity as RDA president. In the summer of 2021 the stables were classed as an 'Asset of Community Value' by the London Borough of Richmond upon Thames and in November 2021 as a 'Building of Townscape Merit', affording it further protection from development.

== Campaign to save the stables ==
In the beginning of 2021 the stables faced closure due to the landlord wishing to sell the property on expiry of the lease. A community effort raised over £1 million to purchase the building via crowd funding. However, following lack of agreement on the purchase price, the stables were closed. The purchase was finally agreed and completed in late 2021. Following the end of the lease, the stables moved temporarily to Manor Farm Stables next to Ham Polo Club in Petersham. Following purchase, the old stables were fully renovated, with the return to Teddington in the summer of 2024.
