= Wimbledon power station =

Former coal-fired power station

- Country: England
- Location: Wimbledon, London
- Coordinates: 51°25′52″N 00°11′33″W
- Status: Decommissioned
- Construction began: 1897
- Commission date: 1899
- Decommission date: 1968
- Owners: Wimbledon Corporation (1897–1933); London and Home Counties Joint Electricity Authority (1933–1948); British Electricity Authority (1948–1955); Central Electricity Authority (1955–1957); Central Electricity Generating Board (1958–1968)
- Operator: As operator

Thermal power station
- Primary fuel: Coal
- Turbine technology: Steam turbines
- Cooling source: River water

Power generation
- Units operational: 1 x 1 MW, 1 x 1.5 MW, 4 x 3.75 MW, 1 x 7.5 MW = 25.2 MW (total)
- Make and model: British Thomson-Houston, Metropolitan Vickers, Parsons
- Nameplate capacity: 25.2 MW
- Annual net output: 17,509 MWh (1946)

Wimbledon power station was a coal-fired power station which supplied electricity to the Borough of Wimbledon and the surrounding area of London, England, from 1899 to 1968. The power station was developed by the Wimbledon Corporation which operated it up to 1933. The London and Home Counties Joint Electricity Authority operated the station from 1933 until the nationalisation of the British electricity supply industry in 1948. It was redeveloped by the owners several times to meet the increased demand for electricity.

== History ==
Wimbledon Corporation applied in 1897 for a provisional order under the Electric Lighting Acts to generate and supply electricity to Borough of Wimbledon. The Wimbledon Electric Lighting Order 1897 was granted by the Board of Trade and was confirmed by Parliament through the Electric Lighting Orders Confirmation (No. 2) Act 1897 (60 & 61 Vict. c. lxii). The power station was built in Durnsford Road, Wimbledon (51°25′52″N 0°11′33″W) and was commissioned in 1899. Further Provisional Orders were granted in 1903 and 1911.

During the 1926 general strike, 113 employees of the Wimbledon electricity undertaking went on strike. Seven of the leaders were refused re-employment, whereas the 60 staff who had not gone on strike were rewarded with a bonus of £368.

The British electricity supply industry was nationalised in 1948 under the provisions of the Electricity Act 1947 (10 & 11 Geo. 6. c. 54). The Wimbledon electricity undertaking and London and Home Counties Joint Electricity Authority were abolished, ownership of Wimbledon power station was vested in the British Electricity Authority, and subsequently the Central Electricity Authority and the Central Electricity Generating Board (CEGB). At the same time the electricity distribution and sales responsibilities of the Wimbledon electricity undertaking were transferred to the London Electricity Board (LEB).

Wimbledon power station closed in 1968.

=== Plant in 1923 ===
By 1923 the plant comprised boilers delivering 161,000 lb/h (20.3 kg/s) of steam to:

- 2 × 350 kW reciprocating engines driving alternating current (AC) alternators
- 1 × 625 kW reciprocating engine AC alternator
- 2 × 1,000 kW steam turbo-alternators (AC)
- 1 × 1,500 kW steam turbo-alternator (AC)

These machines had a total generating capacity of 4,825 kW.

Electricity supply to consumers was single phase, 50 Hz, 220 Volt.

A 3,750 kW Metropolitan Vickers set was powered from a 50,000 lb/hr Babcock & Wilcox boiler.

=== Plant in 1954 ===
By 1954 the plant comprised:

- Boilers:
  - 2 × Babcock & Wilcox 60,000 lb/h (7.56 kg/s) chain grate stoker boilers
  - 2 × Spearing 26,000 lb/h (3.28 kg/s) boilers
  - 1 × Spearing 50,000 lb/h (6.3 kg/s) boiler

Total evaporative capacity 222,000 lb/h (27.97 kg/s)), steam conditions were 250 psi and 600 °F and 700 °F (17.2 bar and 316 °C and 371 °C), steam was supplied to:

- Generators:
  - 1 × 1.0 MW British Thomson-Houston – Curtis turbo-alternator
  - 1 × 1.5 MW British Thomson-Houston – Curtis turbo-alternator
  - 4 × 3.75 MW Metropolitan Vickers turbo-alternators, single phase
  - 1 × 7.5 MW Parsons turbo-alternator, 2-phase (installed 1930)

The total generating capacity was 25.2 MW with an output capacity of 18 MW.

Condenser water was taken from the River Wandle.

== Operations ==
=== Operating data 1912–20 ===
Wimbledon operating data 1912–3.

| Year | Capacity of plant, MW | Maximum load, MW | Electricity sold, MWh | No. of customers |
|---|---|---|---|---|
| 1912 | 3.325 | 1.70 | 2,903 | 5,589 |
| 1920 | 4.825 | 1.988 | 3,310 | 7,805 |

=== Operating data 1921–23 ===
The electricity supply data for the period 1921–23 was:

Wimbledon power station supply data 1921–23 in MWh
| Electricity Use | 1921 | 1922 | 1923 |
|---|---|---|---|
| Lighting and domestic | 1,873 | 2,023 | 2,799 |
| Public lighting | 447 | 403 | 436 |
| Traction | 0 | 0 | 0 |
| Power | 1,694 | 1,852 | 2,922 |
| Bulk supply | 0 | 0 | 0 |
| Total use | 4,013 | 4,278 | 6,157 |

Electricity Loads on the system were:

| Year | 1921 | 1922 | 1923 |
|---|---|---|---|
| Maximum load (kW) | 2,501 | 2,725 | 3,600 |
| Total connections (kW) | 13,955 | 15,369 | 17,168 |
| Load factor (%) | 25.5 | 24.4 | 244.9 |

Revenue from the sale of current (in 1923) was £96,316; the surplus of revenue over expenses was £52,963.

=== Operating data 1934–37 ===
Wimbledon operating data 1934–37, this includes electricity purchased from the national grid.

| Year | Electricity sold, MWh |
|---|---|
| 1934 | 43,609 |
| 1935 | 47,357 |
| 1936 | 60,042 |
| 1937 | 68,852 |

=== Operating data 1946 ===
In 1946 Wimbledon power station supplied 17,509 MWh of electricity; the maximum output load was 18,080 kW. The load factor was 11.1%, and the thermal efficiency was 10.94%.

=== Operating data 1954–67 ===
Operating data for the period 1954–67 was:

Wimbledon power station operating data, 1954–67
| Year | Running hours or load factor (per cent) | Max output capacity MW | Electricity supplied MWh | Thermal efficiency per cent |
|---|---|---|---|---|
| 1954 | 511 | 18 | 2,697 | 6.80 |
| 1955 | 724 | 18 | 6,209 | 9.64 |
| 1956 | 1039 | 18 | 7,984 | 10.49 |
| 1957 | 336 | 18 | 1,978 | 8.79 |
| 1958 | 623 | 18 | 4,533 | 10.59 |
| 1961 | 2.0 % | 18 | 3,131 | 9.52 |
| 1962 | 2.7 % | 18 | 4,189 | 10.24 |
| 1963 | 6.06 % | 18 | 9,550 | 12.01 |
| 1966 | 3.6 % | 18 | 5,716 | 9.31 |
| 1967 | 2.1 % | 10 | 2,380 | 6.94 |

Electricity sold by Wimbledon power station in MWh

== Railway power station ==
In addition to the statutory public supply Wimbledon power station, the Southern Railway constructed an electricity generating station at Wimbledon to supply traction current for the railway. This private supply power station was built in Durnsford Road in 1913. It was initially equipped with 5 x 5,000 kW turbo alternators supplying power at 11,000 Volts 25 Hz to the trackside substations.

In 1957 it comprised 20 chain-grate boilers with a total evaporative capacity of 430,000 lb/hr (54 kg/s). These supplied steam to:

- 4 × 12.5 MW generators
- 2 × 5.0 MW generators
- 2 × 0.4 MW generators

Giving a total capacity of 60.8 MW.

Cooling water was abstracted from the River Wandle and cooled by five wooden cooling towers. The circulating capacity was 1,333,600 gallons per hour (1.68 m^{3}/s).

In 1946 the station generated 158,441 MWh of electricity. The maximum load was 45.2 MW, the load factor was 40 percent and the thermal efficiency was 18.7 percent.

== See also ==
- Timeline of the UK electricity supply industry
- List of power stations in England
