= List of annual sports events in the London Borough of Richmond upon Thames =

This is a list of annual sports events in the London Borough of Richmond upon Thames.

== Current events ==
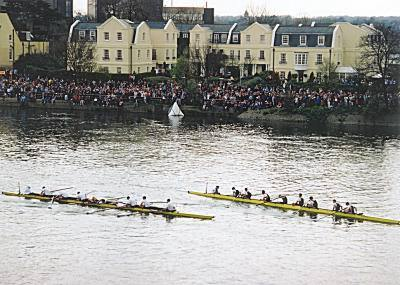
The Boat Race in 2002

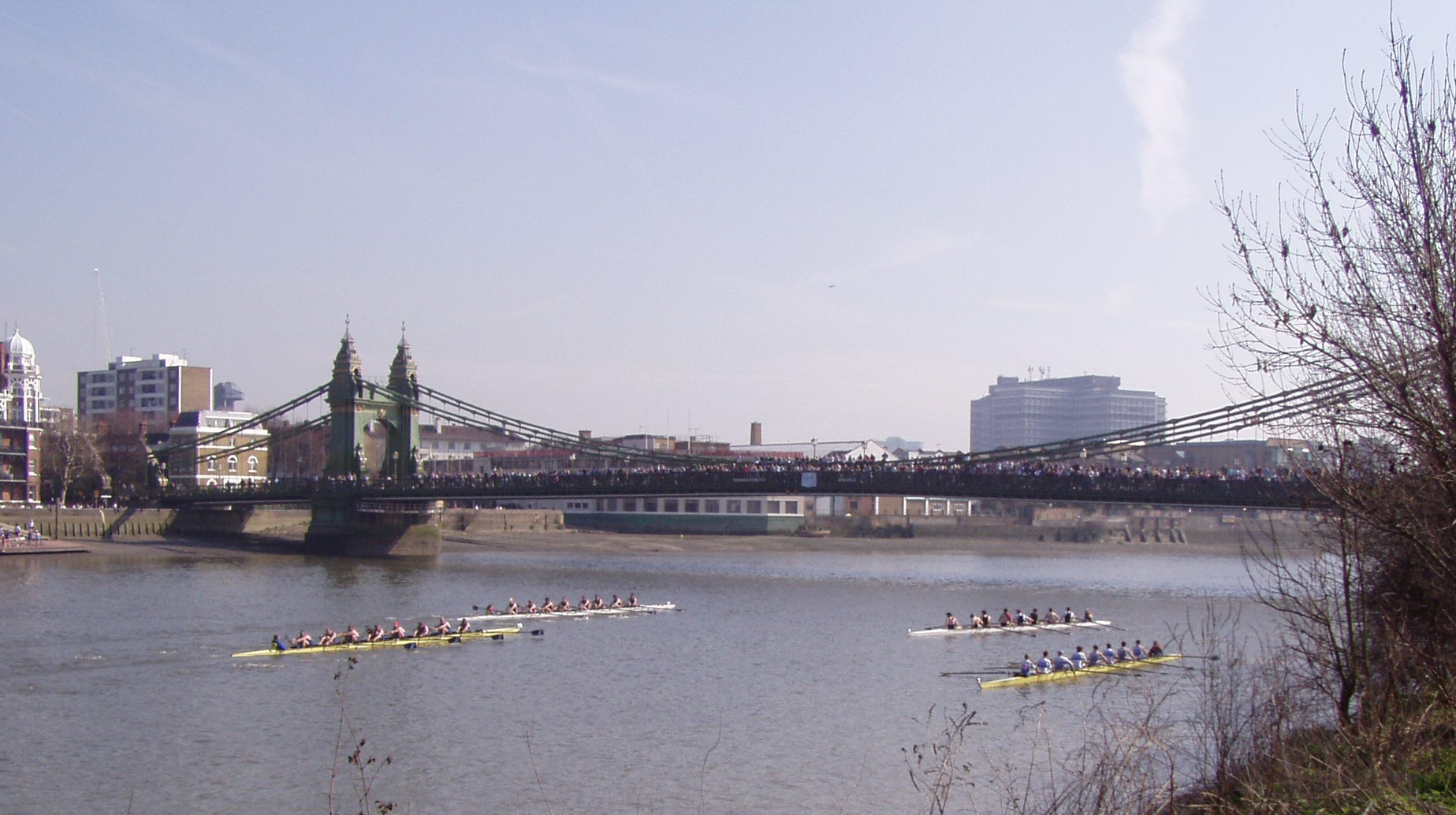
Crews racing under Hammersmith Bridge in the 2005 Head of the River Race

=== Rowing ===
- The Boat Race between the Oxford University Boat Club and the Cambridge University Boat Club, held in March or April
- The Great River Race on the River Thames, between Greenwich and Ham, for traditional-style coxed boats propelled by oars or paddles; it is held in September
- The Head of the River Fours, a processional rowing race held on the Championship Course from Mortlake to Putney in November
- The Head of the River Race, a similar race open to men's eights, held in March
- The Schools' Head of the River Race, held in the spring
- The Scullers Head of the River Race, held in November or December
- The Vesta Veterans International Eights Head of the River Race, which takes place on the day following the Head of the River Race and is open to veteran (also known as masters) eights
- The Wingfield Sculls, a race between single scullers, held in October or November
- The Women's Eights Head of the River Race, held in March

=== Rugby ===
- The Big Game, a rugby union match held in December

== Former events ==
=== Ice skating ===
- Richmond Trophy, an international women's figure skating competition held annually from 1949 to 1980 at the Richmond Ice Rink in Twickenham
- St. Ivel International, an international figure skating competition held annually from 1978 to 1980 at the Richmond Ice Rink in Twickenham
