= North Sheen Recreation Ground =

Coordinates: 51°28′16.1796″N -0°17′5.3808″W

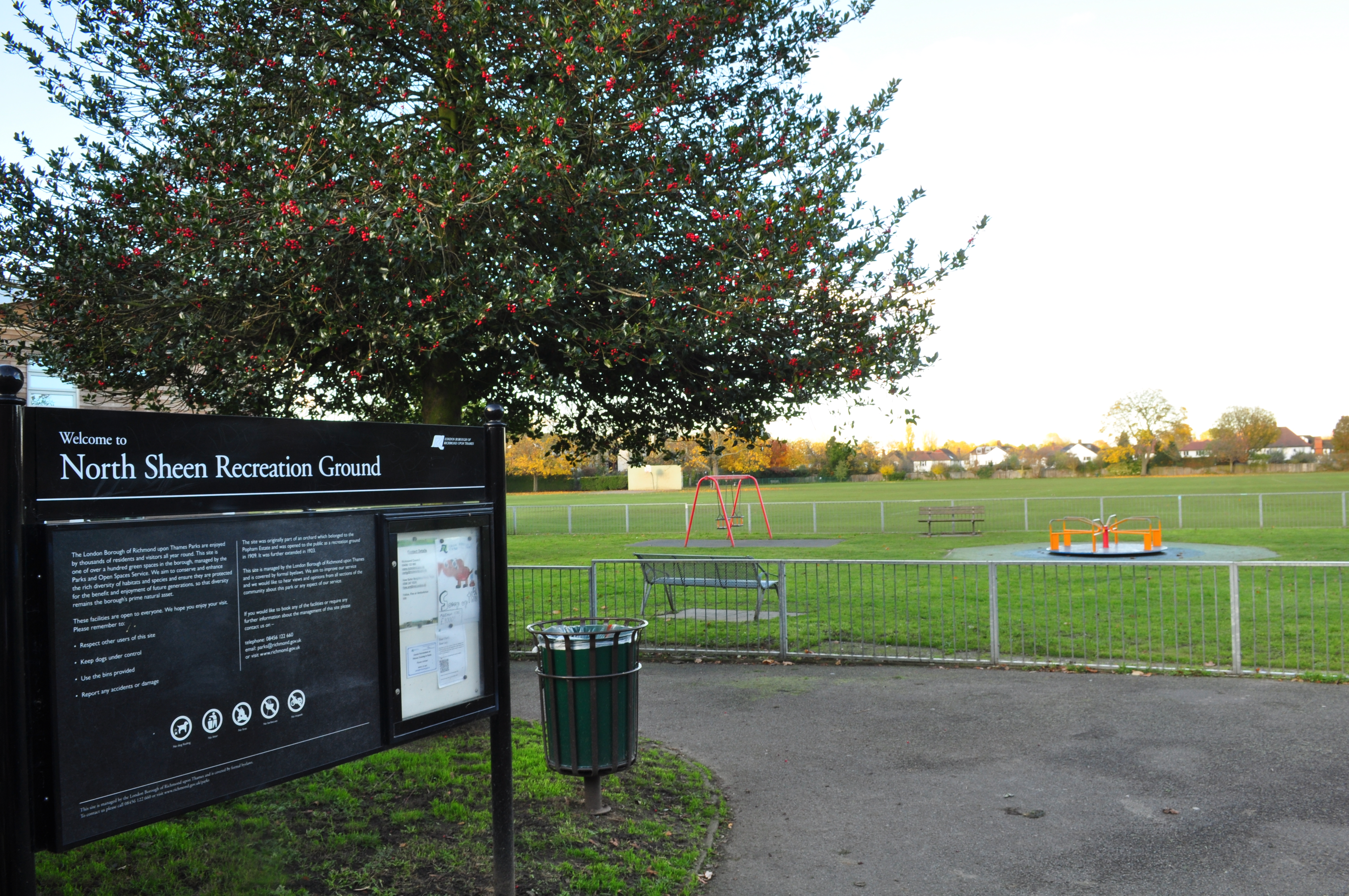
- North Sheen Rec, viewed from Dancer Road
- Type: Municipal
- Location: Kew, Richmond, London
- Created: 1909; extended 1923
- Operator: London Borough of Richmond upon Thames
- Status: Open all year

North Sheen Recreation Ground, in Dancer Road, Kew, Richmond, London, is a recreation area and the home of Kew Park Rangers Football Club.

== History ==
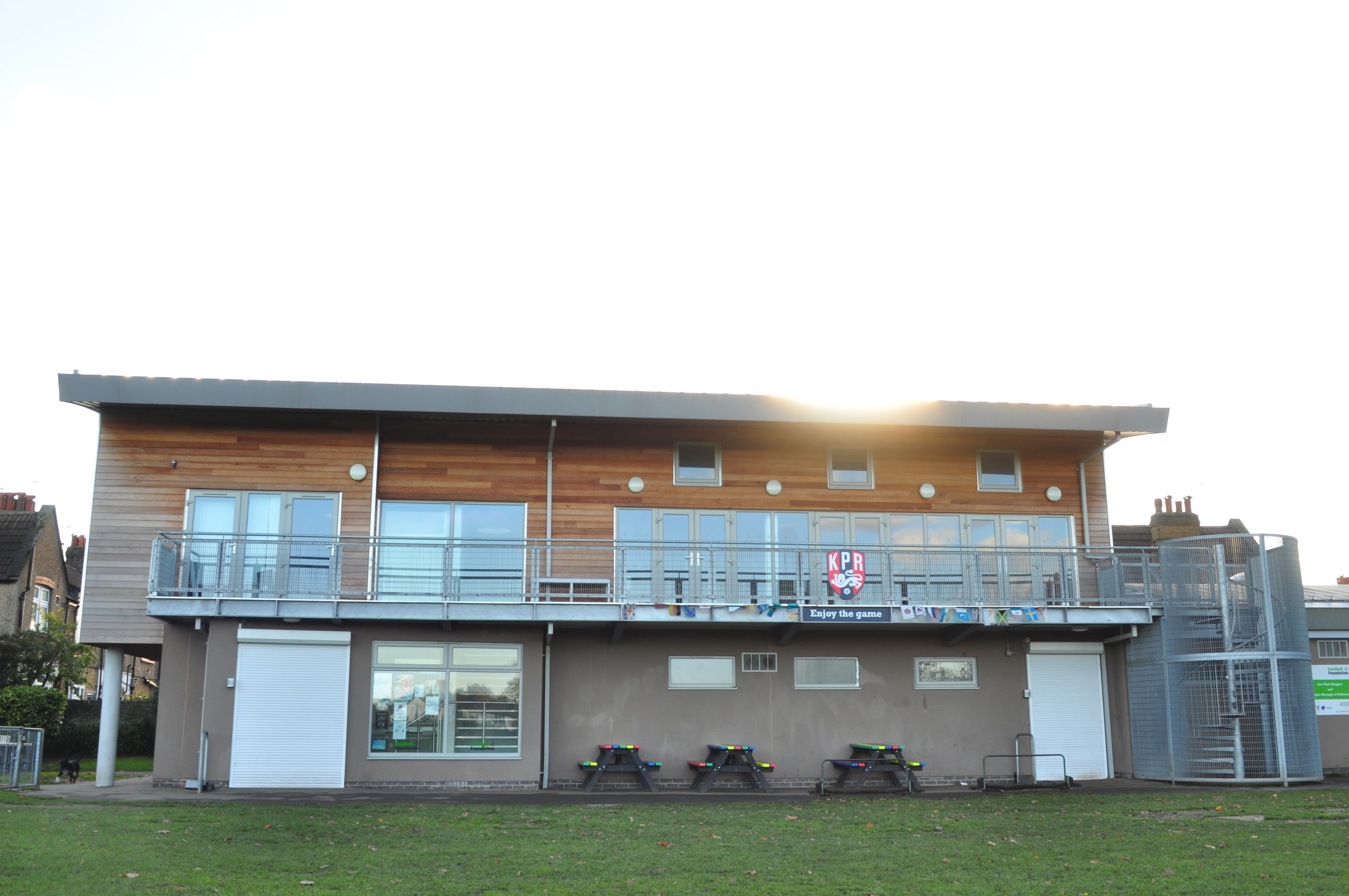
The sports pavilion clubhouse

North Sheen, in the former Municipal Borough of Richmond (Surrey), was first marked on maps from 1904. At that time the area was mostly undeveloped and was used to grow fruit and vegetables for market, but by 1920 residential building was underway. North Sheen was incorporated into Kew in 1965 when the London Borough of Richmond upon Thames was created.

Opened in June 1909 and extended in 1923, the recreation ground was originally part of an orchard belonging to the Popham Estate, owned by the Leyborne Pophams whose family seat was at Littlecote House, Wiltshire.

During the Second World War the recreation ground was used for allotments and there was an underground public shelter opposite what is now the sports pavilion clubhouse.

== Facilities ==
Known locally as "The Rec", it now contains football pitches, a children's paddling pool, two extensive playgrounds, a large dog-free grassed area and a sports pavilion clubhouse, set amongst trees and shrubs. The clubhouse, which cost £1 million and opened in September 2011, includes a community cafe and a community hall. A new children's adventure playground was opened in 2016, and an outdoor gym for adults in 2017.

== Kew Park Rangers ==
Kew Park Rangers
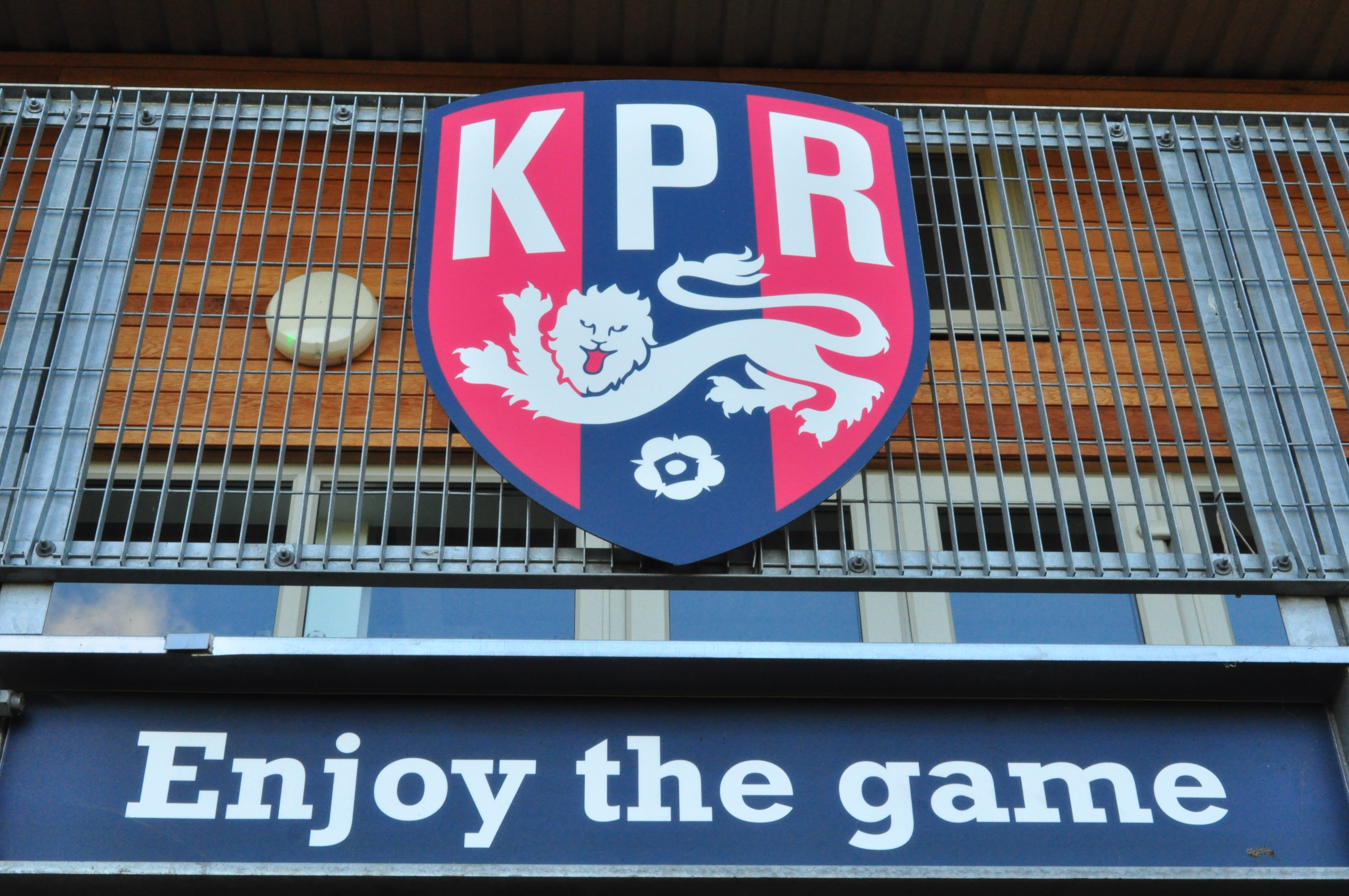
- Full name: Kew Park Rangers Football Club
- Founded: 1997
- Ground: North Sheen Recreation Ground
- Website: https://kewparkrangers.co.uk/

North Sheen Recreation Ground is also home to a local football club for children, Kew Park Rangers, which is a Football Association Charter Standard Community Football Club, the highest level of accreditation under The FA Charter Standard kitemark programme. The club's name is a word play on Queens Park Rangers F.C., a London football team which is also known as QPR.

The club began in 1997 in Westerley Ware, a small park by Kew Bridge.

As the crowd of children grew, alongside tournament and further development ambitions, the club decided to become official and registered for the Surrey County Football Association. Richmond Council eventually came up with a team pitch and a move to the North Sheen Recreation Ground was secured. It became Kew Park Rangers Football Club in summer 1999, and continues to grow. In 2015 it was the Football Association's National Charter Standard Community Club of the Year.

The club has a close working relationship with Fulham F.C. and it regularly employs the services of Fulham coaches to assist and support its coaches.

Queen's Award for Voluntary Service 2022

London Sport Awards 2019 – Finalist – Club of the Year

Richmond Heroes Awards 2018 – Highly Commended – Outstanding Sporting Achievement

Football Business Awards 2018 – National Winner – Best Football Community Scheme – Non-Premier League 2016 – Finalist – Best Club Marketing Initiative – Non-Premier League 2016 – Finalist – Best Football Community Scheme – Non-Premier League 2015 – Finalist – Best Football Community Scheme – Non-Premier League

Surrey County FA Respect Award 2014–15 – Winner

Surrey Youth League Toshiba Fair-Play Award 2017–18 – Winner 2016–17 – Winner 2012–13 – Winner 2006–07 – Winner

FA Charter Standard Award 2015–16 – National Winner – Charter Standard Community Club 2015–16 – Regional Winner – Charter Standard Community Club 2008–09 – County Winner – Charter Standard Community Club 2006–07 – County Winner – Charter Development Club 2005–06 – County Winner – Charter Development Club 2002–03 – Regional Winner – Charter Standard Club

FA Charter Standard Community Club 2008–09 FA Charter Standard Development Club 2004–05 FA Charter Standard club 2001–02

== Awards ==
The recreation ground was given a Green Flag Award in 2018.

== See also ==
- Parks, open spaces and nature reserves in Richmond upon Thames
