= North Sheen =

Coordinates: 51.474778°N 0.278421°W

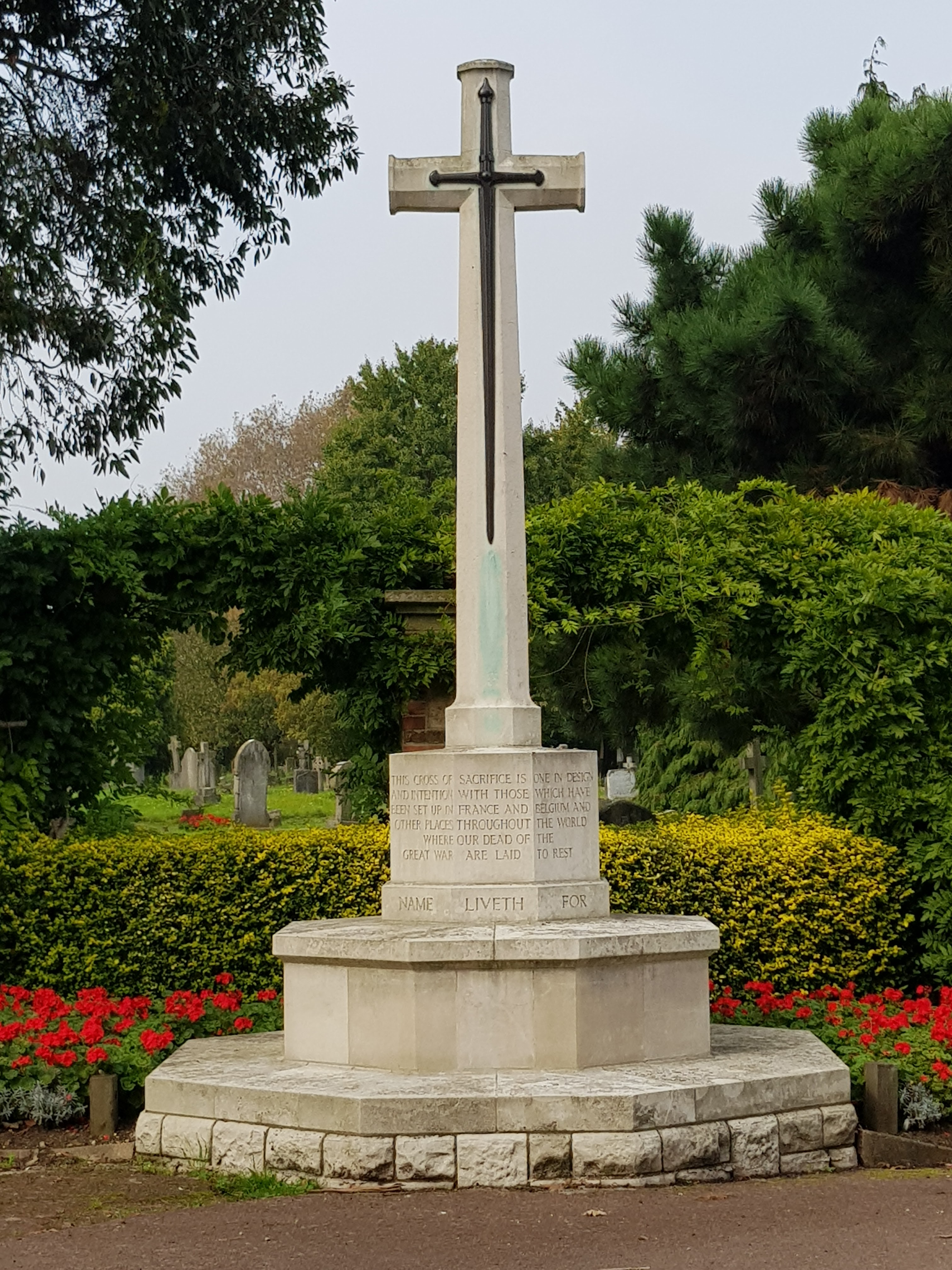

- Location within Greater London
- OS grid reference: TQ195765
- London borough: Richmond
- Ceremonial county: Greater London
- Region: London
- Country: England
- Sovereign state: United Kingdom
- Post town: RICHMOND
- Postcode district: TW9, TW10
- Dialling code: 020
- Police: Metropolitan
- Fire: London
- Ambulance: London
- UK Parliament: Richmond Park
- London Assembly: South West

North Sheen is an area of London, England in the former Municipal Borough of Richmond (Surrey). (Note: North Sheen was one of six wards in the Municipal Borough of Richmond (Surrey). "At the Court at Buckingham Palace, the 9th day of September, 1907". The London Gazette. TSO. 13 September 1907. pp. 6218–20.) It was incorporated into Kew in 1965 when the London Borough of Richmond upon Thames was created.

There is a North Sheen Bowling Club, North Sheen Cemetery (Note: North Sheen Cemetery (also known as “Fulham New Cemetery”) opened in 1909. "North Sheen and Mortlake Cemeteries". London Borough of Hammersmith & Fulham.) and North Sheen Recreation Ground.

== History ==
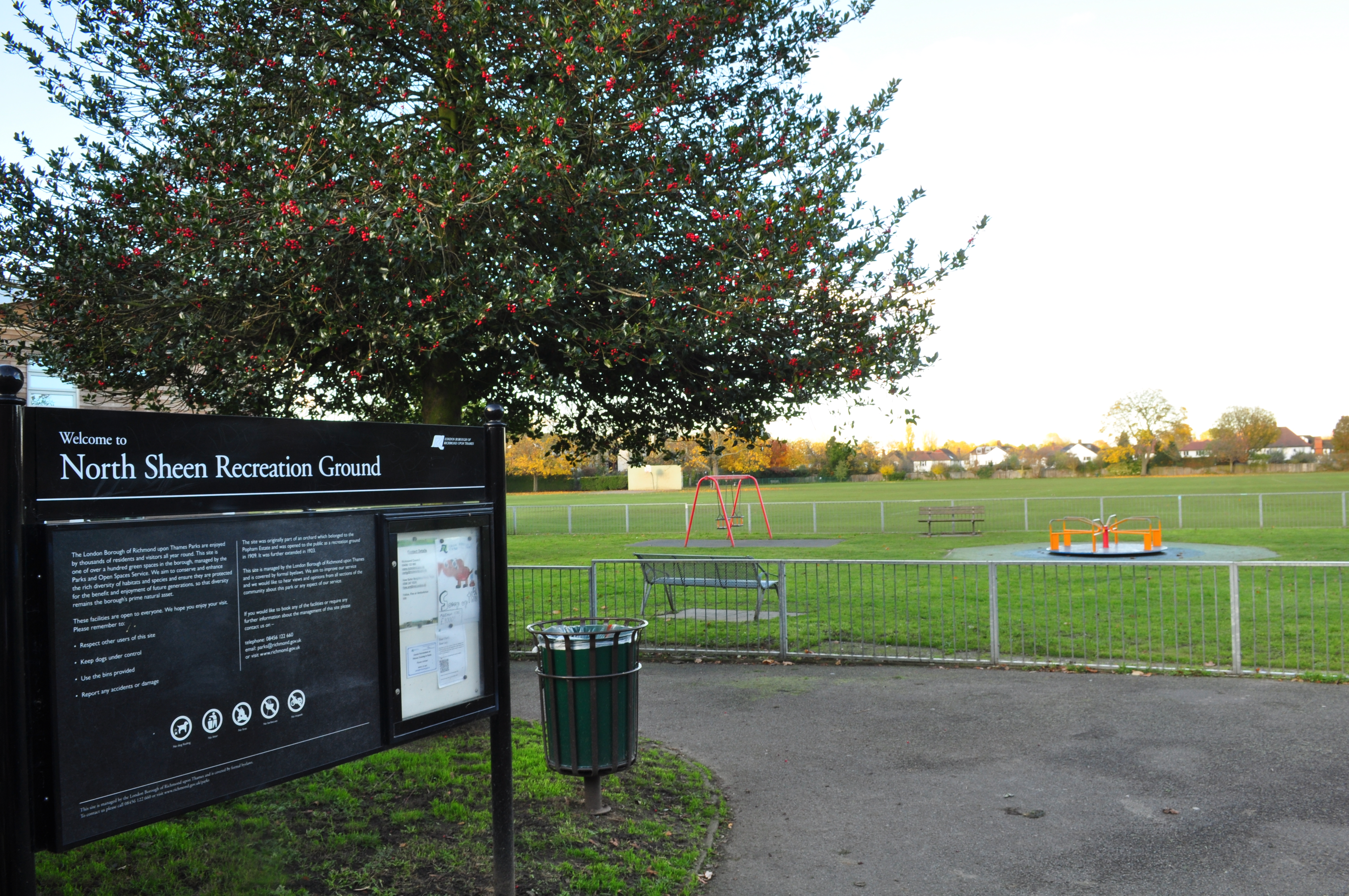
North Sheen Recreation Ground, now in Kew, viewed from Darell Road

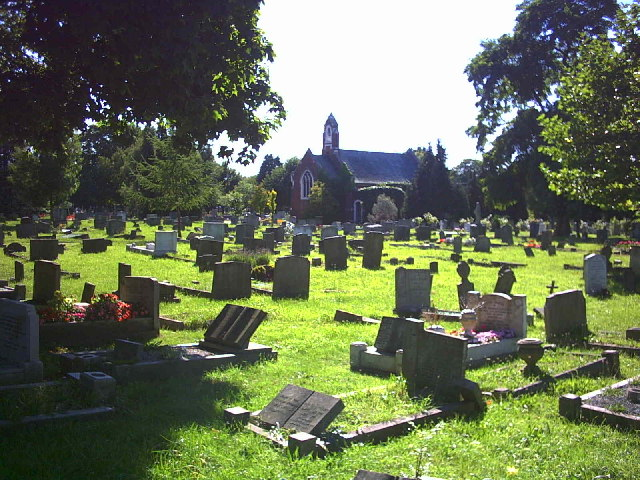
North Sheen Cemetery, also now in Kew

North Sheen, whose etymology is shared with East Sheen, formed a civil parish from 1894 to 1965. The parish was formed from the part of the parish of Mortlake in Richmond Municipal Borough which the area became part of in 1892. Under the Local Government Act 1894, a new North Sheen parish was created from part of Mortlake, with the remainder of Mortlake then forming part of Barnes Urban District. The North Sheen parish covered an area of 329 acres (1.33 km^{2}). In 1901 the population was 2,807 and in 1951 it was 7,429. On 1 April 1965 the civil parish was abolished.

North Sheen was first marked on maps from 1904. At that time it was mostly undeveloped, but by 1920 residential building was underway.

== Transport ==
- North Sheen railway station.

== In fiction ==
A major section of H. G. Wells' The War of the Worlds takes place at Sheen, depicting with considerable detail the destruction caused there by Wells' Martian invaders.

== See also ==
- The Barn Church, Kew
- North Sheen Cemetery
- North Sheen railway station
- North Sheen Recreation Ground
- Holy Trinity Richmond
