= Ham Lands =

Nature reserve in Ham, London, England, UK

Coordinates: 51.435°N 0.325°W

Ham Lands is a 72-hectare (180-acre) Local Nature Reserve and Site of Metropolitan Importance for Nature Conservation in Ham in the London Borough of Richmond upon Thames and the Royal Borough of Kingston upon Thames. It has a long section of the Thames Path and is popular with walkers, nature lovers, and having two stables in easy reach, horse-riders. Using paths cleared by BMX off-road enthusiasts it has a BMX track near Teddington Lock.

The site is a tract of grassland and intermittently wooded scrub. It has a long curved western border with the semi-tidal Thames and shorter eastern direct frontage to a residential road and is therefore bounded by and crossed by many paths. It is riven into north and south parts by a watersports lagoon/lake so much associated with Thames Young Mariners it usually goes by that name.

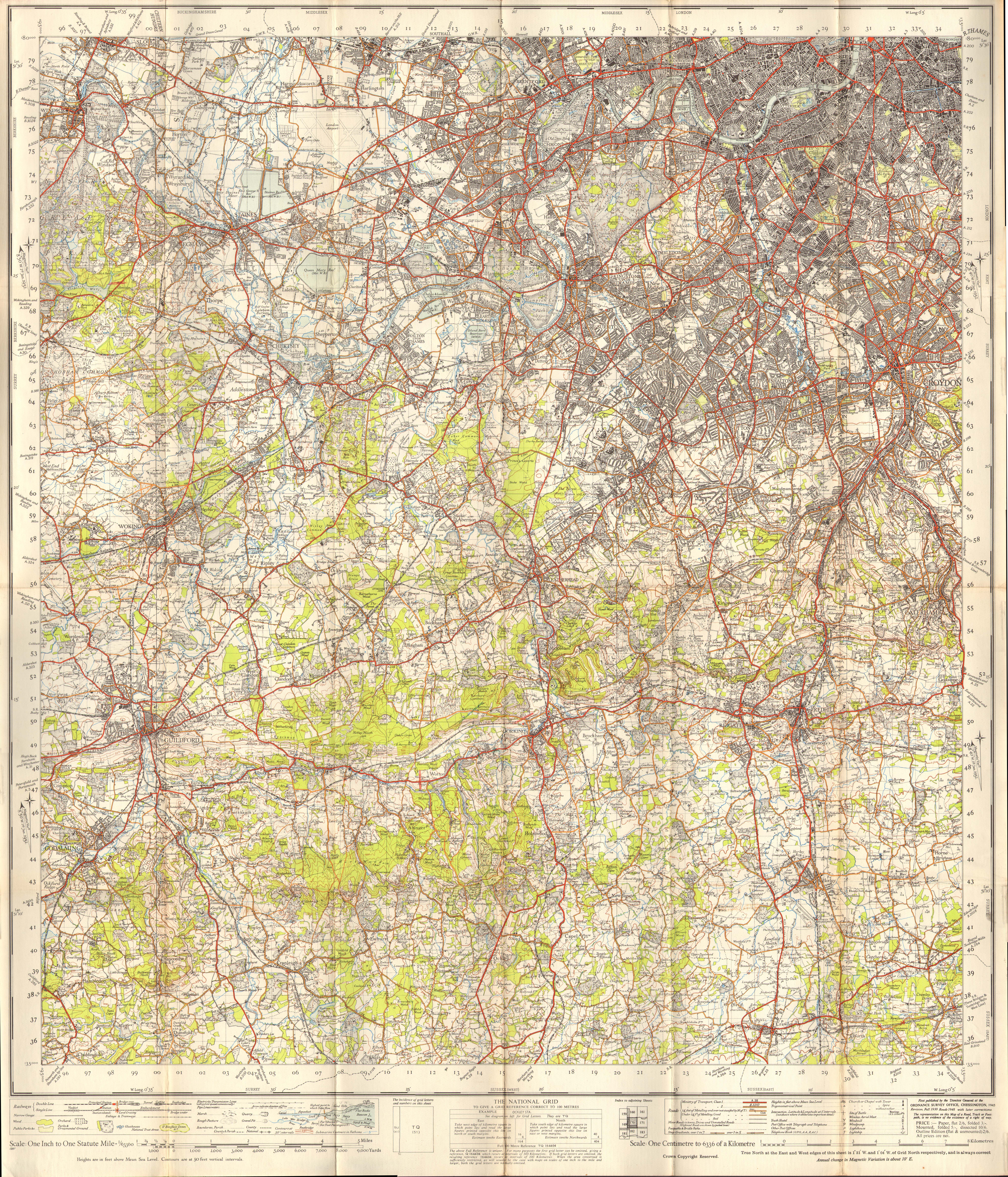
Extract from one-inch scale Ordnance Survey map (1945) showing this land in white west of Petersham, Ham House and west of Ham which had slightly fewer streets. 'Ferry' indicates Hammerton's Ferry

The land was the demense of the manor of Ham, dominated by Ham House which resembling its present visitors' attraction form was a product of the power of the Cabal, an acronym of the five powerful ministers of Charles II of England and Scotland, including the second husband of the Countess (in her own right) of Dysart, John Maitland, 1st Duke of Lauderdale. It stayed with the Earldom, subjected to minor sell offs and leases, until a point in the lifetime of the last Earl who died in 1935. In 1904 as population and the local towns and suburbs expanded greatly, almost all of today's Ham Lands were leased by the Ham River Grit Co. Ltd. for excavation of sand and ballast such as gravel. Workers constructed a wharf and processing plant where predominantly barges (as opposed to road carts) loaded these aggregates for industrial, infrastructure and residential building sites. A canal/sluiceway was made through the towpath in the 1920s to link to a perpendicular barge dock, now the Thames Young Mariners lagoon. In time, all gravel pits away from the dock/lagoon were backfilled with hard core (demolished debris) and soil from Middlesex, the County of London and north Surrey, creating today's diversity of habitats which attract many bird and butterfly species. In the 1960s when this industrial use ended, Wates built the houses fronting this open space, on the inland side of Riverside Drive its pavement being an eastern perimeter path of most of the Ham Lands.

The construction of Teddington Lock in 1904 and dredging of the river making it the limit of the tidal Thames (Tideway) thereby raised the Ham Lands section of towpath. The southern half of the in-filled Ham Lands lie at approximately the limit of all ordinary tides combined with winter fluvial floods and the northern half, mostly below that threshold. The longstanding flood-meadows have a wide range of wild flowers and many plants which are rare in London. Some of the more unusual plants found include meadow saxifrage, hemlock water-dropwort, yellow vetchling, hoary/silver cinquefoil (five-leaf), dittander/pepperwort, bee orchid and pyramidal orchid.

Plans to build more on the land than along its eastern edge were met with many technical officials' concerns and overwhelming public objection (including from all local representatives in power) leading to a dismissal in 1983. A survey of the flora and fungi was carried out by Nigel Hepper in 1985 and a report published two years later which recognised eight zones.

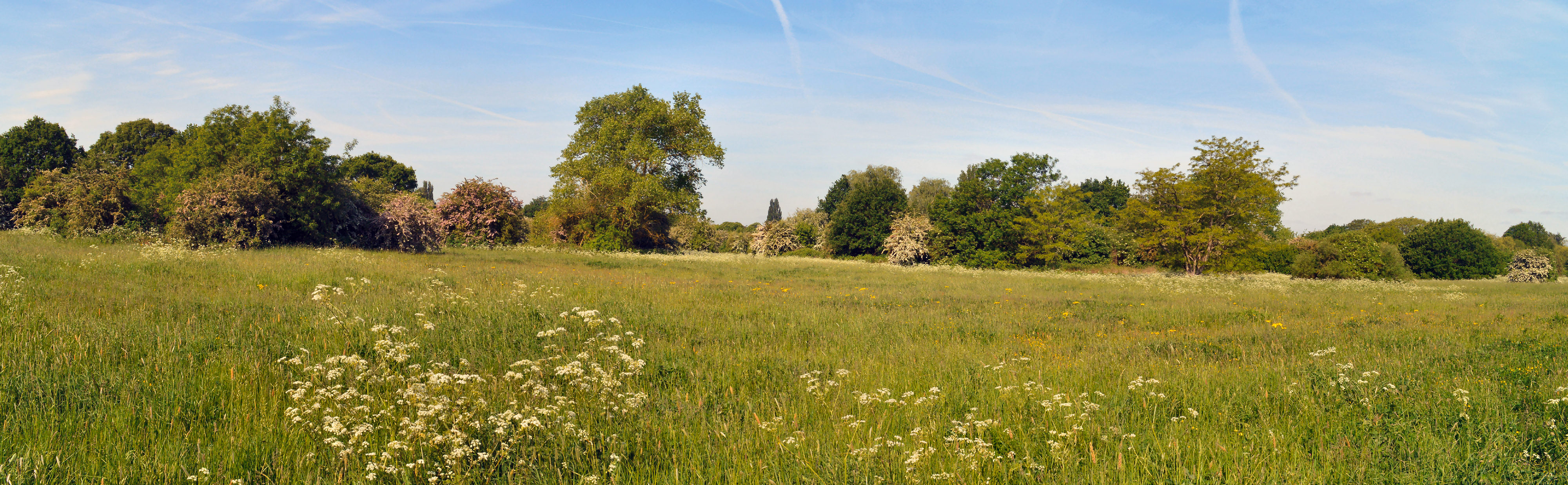
Ham Lands South
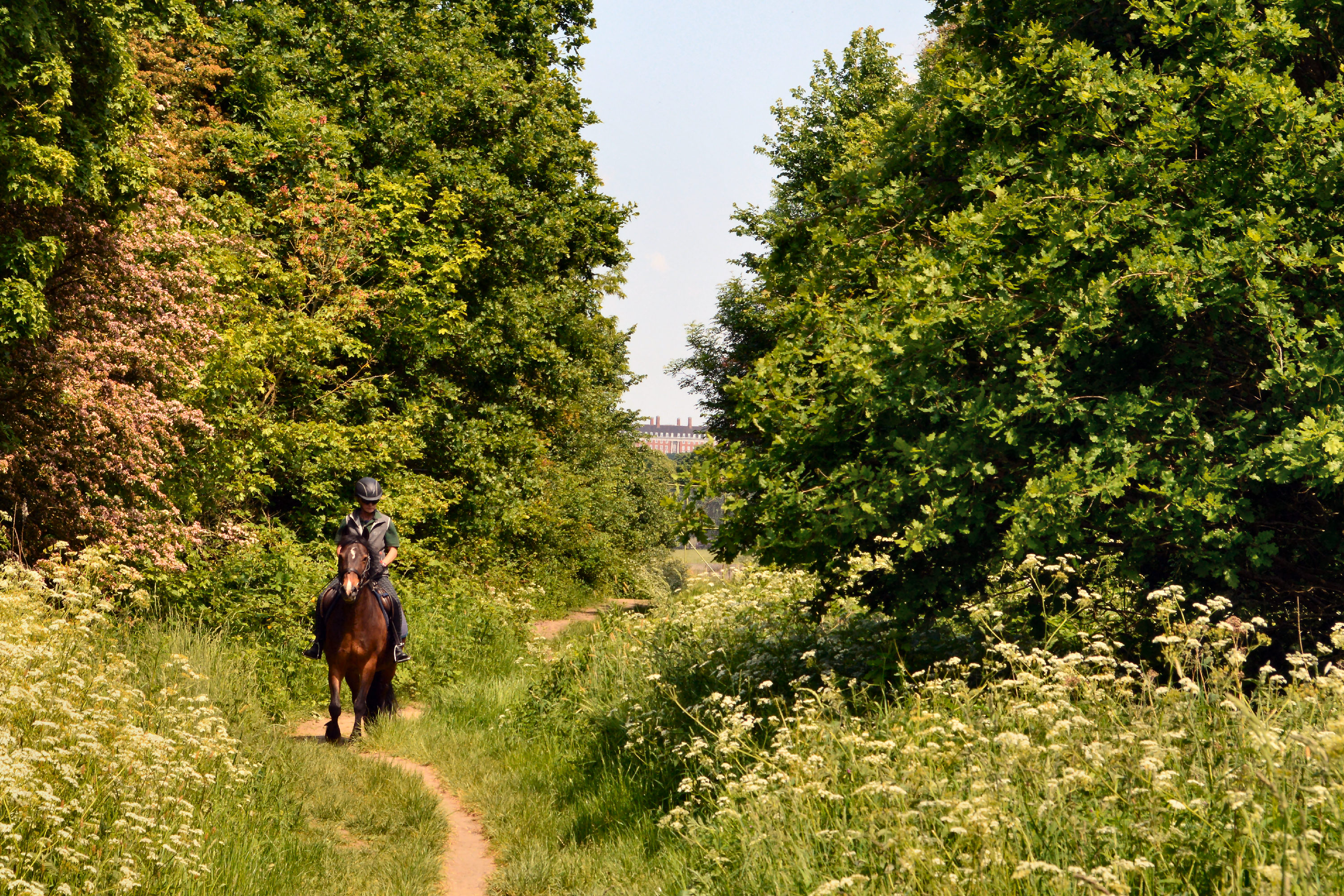
View of Richmond Hill

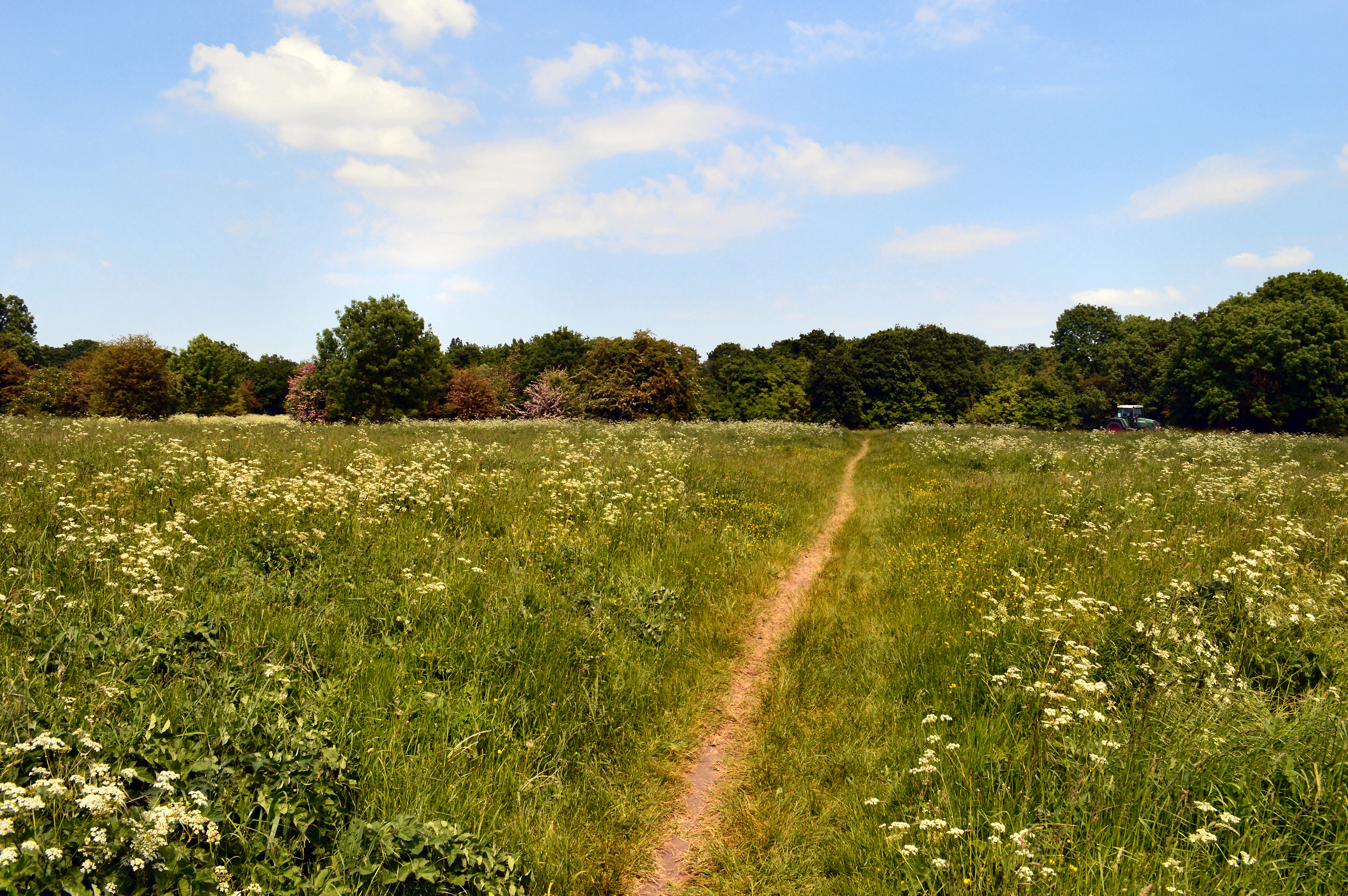
Ham Lands north

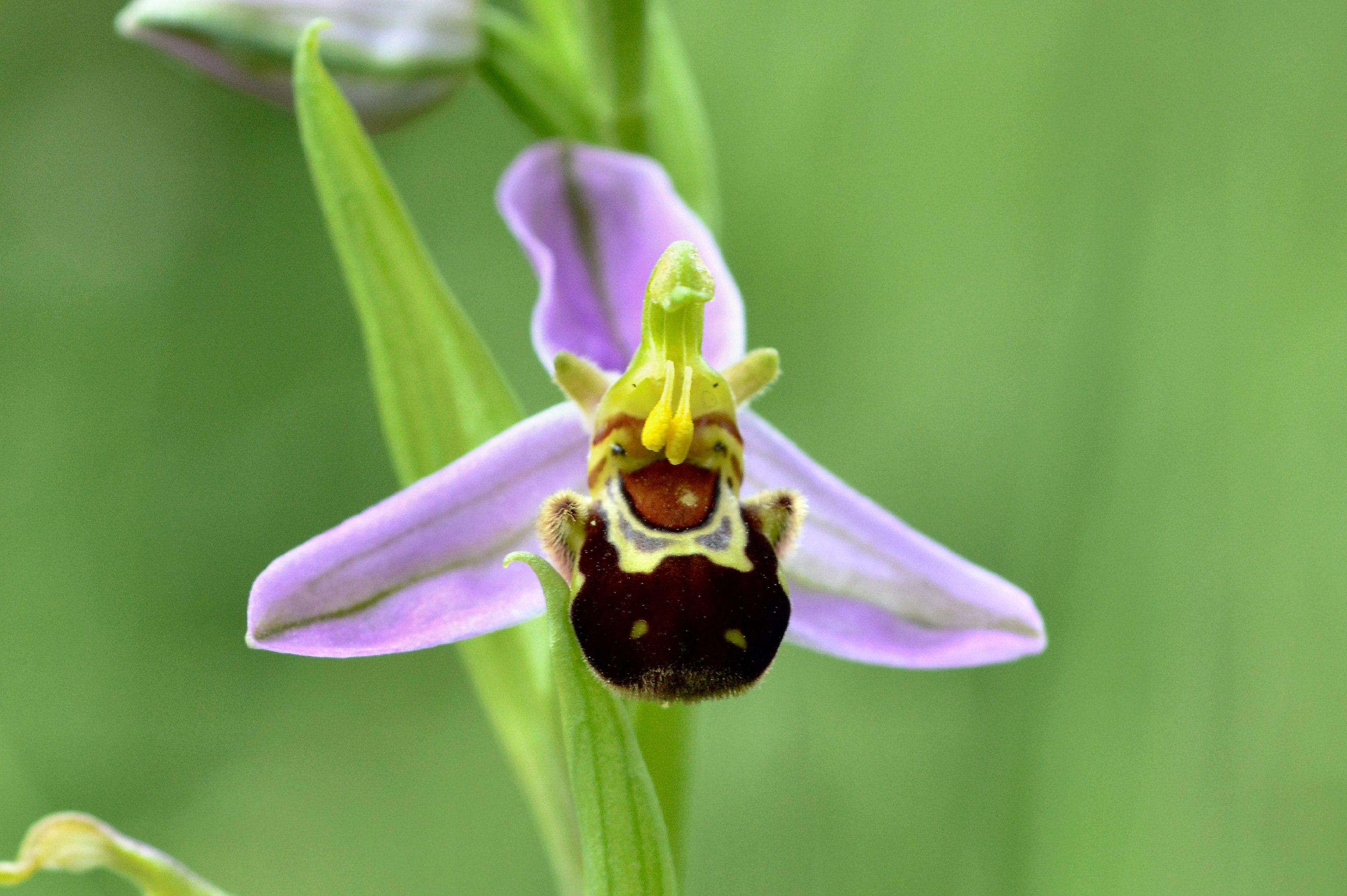
Bee orchid

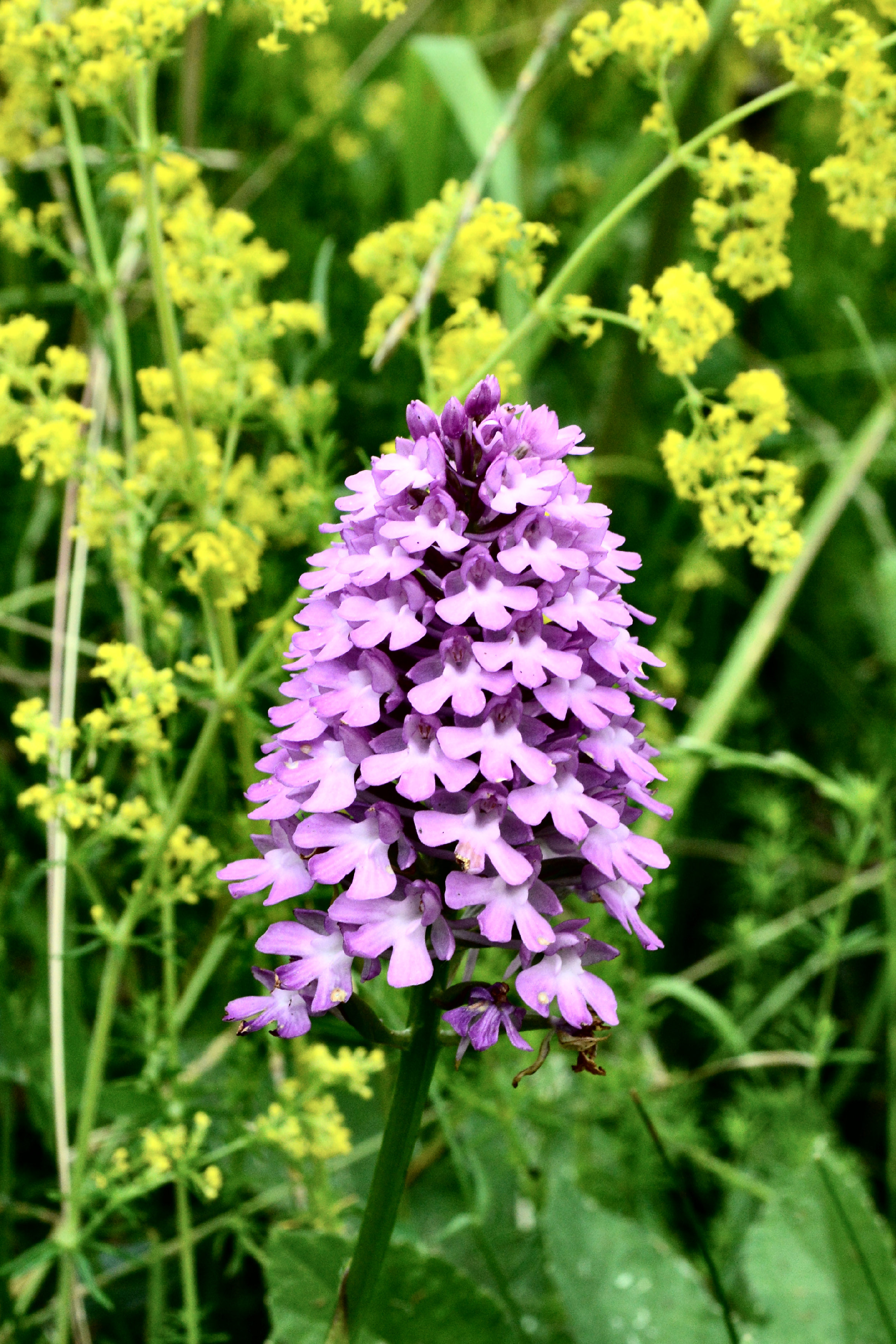
Pyramidal Orchid

== See also ==
- Teddington Lock and Footbridges
- Hammerton's Ferry
- Richmond Hill, London
- Ham and Petersham Common
- Eel Pie Island
- Towpath murders
