= Richmond Baseball and Softball Club =

Information
- League: British Baseball Federation; AAA, AA and A divisions (2014)
- Location: Ham, London Borough of Richmond upon Thames
- Ballpark: Connare Field
- Founded: 1992
- Nickname(s): The Flames, The Knights, The Dragons, The Dukes
- League championships: 2006, 2010 (Flames, National League); 2010 (Knights, AA); 2013 (Dukes, A); 2016 (Knights, AAA)
- Colors: Red, Black, White, Grey (previously Royal Blue, Navy, Red)
- Manager: Knights: John Irving; Dragons: Nicholas Hadley-Kamptz; Dukes: David D'Urbano
- Website: Official website

Current uniforms
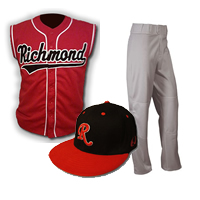

Richmond Baseball & Softball Club is a baseball and softball club based in Ham in the London Borough of Richmond upon Thames, England. It was founded in 1992 by Wayne Nash. The club had three registered teams in the British Baseball Federation's league system for the 2013 season; Richmond Knights in the BBF AAA South Division, Richmond Dragons in the BBF South AA Division and the Richmond Dukes in the BBF Single A South Division.

The club also runs a summer camp for youth players and entered a team in the BBF Pony league (ages 14–16) for the 2014 season. Richmond has entered into a club affiliation with three time NBL champions Southern Nationals for the 2014 season, allowing both clubs to benefit from player movement and development.

With more than 70 active members, the club is one of the largest clubs in the British Baseball community.

== History ==
Richmond Baseball Club was founded as Fulham Flames by youth worker Wayne Nash in 1992 after he had watched a baseball movie at a local cinema and became very interested in the sport. Initially consisting of only one team, the club has grown, adding a second team; the Knights in 2000 and a third team; the Dragons in 2003. Development teams have been added to the club's roster as needed and in 2012 the club added the Dukes as a rookie/Single A team in the BBF leagues.

Due to player and coach departures the top team Richmond Flames, a National League mainstay and multiple champions, was withdrawn from the National Baseball League in 2012, but the club established an official affiliation with Southern Nationals, the three-time National League champions, in 2014.

== Facilities ==
The club plays its home games at Connare Field in Richmond, named after player Vincent Connare who helped construct and fund the field in 2002 when the club was looking to upgrade its facilities to fit BBF National League standards. The club also has a second diamond on nearby Ham Lands, nicknamed Flood Field due to its proximity to the Thames river.

Together with Kew and Ham Football Association, RBSC also shares a clubhouse with multiple changing rooms, full bar and kitchen and a lounge with Wi-Fi and TV.

Connare Field was completely refurbished in 2014 thanks to a grant from Sport England's Inspired Facilities fund. New dual batting cages were also installed, improving the playing facilities. The club is looking to further improve the playing facilities by adding dugouts and spectator seating.

== Honours ==
The Flames became the 2006 National Champions by defeating the Croydon Pirates two games to one in the final. The Flames then finished runners up in 2008 and again in 2009 before regaining the National League title in 2010 with a 10-1 victory over the Bracknell Blazers.

Farm teams the Richmond Knights and Richmond Dragons have had successful seasons, most notably the Knights marathon 20-19 defeat of the Leicester Blue Sox in the 2010 BBF AA Championship Game and the Dragons pennant win in Single A in 2010.

After promoting the Knights to AAA and Dragons to AA in 2011, the club added a new Single A team aimed at rookies; the Richmond Dukes, named after the local history and the location of the field on Dukes Avenue/Riverside Drive.

In 2013, only the second year of existence for the Dukes, they overcame a slow start to win the Single A National Championship.

== Management ==
The club elects the club management every year at the Annual General Meeting, normally held in the off-season. The current committee consists of:

- Club President: Craig Taylor
- Treasurer: Spencer Huet
- Vice President: Jared Thomley
- Secretary: Jared Thomas
- Field Maintenance Officer: Per Nilsson-Eklöf
- New Member Officer: Chris Robertson
- Equipment Officer: Michael Jimenez
- Safeguarding Officer: Cam Esmond
- Social Media & Communication Officer: Paul Tiley
- Advisor: David D'Urbano
- Advisor: Euan Shields

Former board members:

- Ian Cox
- John Walmsley
- Vincent Connare
- John Irving
- Jesus Gandara
- Steve Falla
- Brad Harris
- Nigel Stephens

== See also ==
- Baseball in the United Kingdom
- British Baseball Federation
