= Twickenham Ferry =

Ferry route in London Borough of Richmond

The Twickenham Ferry, sometimes known as Dysart's Ferry, was a historic ferry crossing of the River Thames in what is now the London Borough of Richmond upon Thames, England. The ferry connected a location just downstream to Eel Pie Island in the town of Twickenham on the northern bank of the river with Ham House on the southern bank. It should not be confused with today's Hammerton's Ferry, which crosses the river some distance downstream of the route of the Twickenham Ferry.

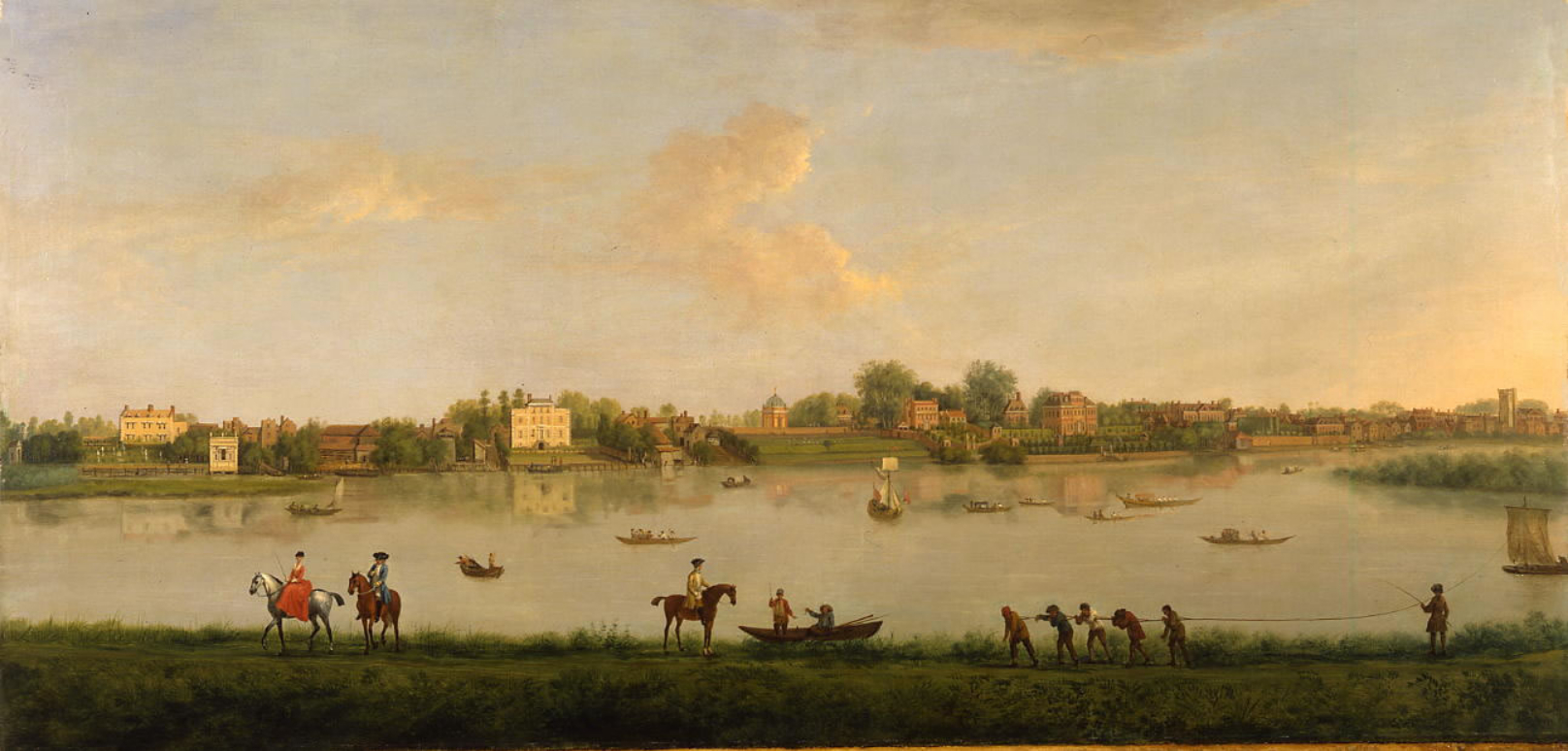
The Thames at Twickenham by Peter Tillemans, 1724

The earliest documentary reference to its existence known is in an ordinance of the Privy Council dated 19 August 1652, in which it was listed, with others, prohibiting use after sundown except by special dispensation. The right to license ferrymen was always claimed by the owners of Ham House, notably the Dysart family. The earliest known ferryman was Richard Blower, licensed prior to 1692.

Over the years several rival ferries were operated. One, in the 1740s, was the subject of a court case brought by the Earl of Dysart and as a result closed down.

The rival Hammerton's Ferry commenced operation in 1908. The Earl of Dysart again brought legal action against the operator, but this time he lost and the rival ferry remained in operation. When ownership of Ham House was transferred to the National Trust in 1948, ownership of the Twickenham Ferry was transferred to a private operator. After further changes in ownership, a decline in traffic and a long dispute about the right of way down the slipway on the Twickenham side it finally closed in about 1970.

== Cultural depictions ==
Twickenham Ferry features in Charles Dickens' novel Little Dorrit when Arthur Clennam visits Meagles and crosses to Ham and back one morning. It is further commemorated in a song of 1878 written and composed by Theo Marzials (1850–1920).
