= Ham Christian Centre =

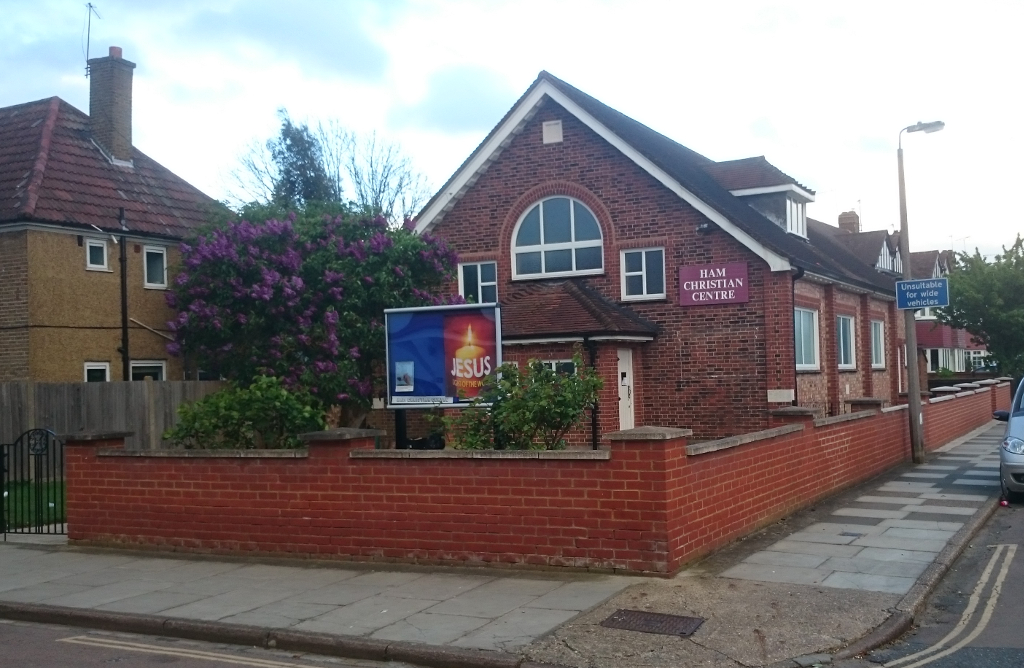
- Ham Christian Centre, Lock Road, Ham
- Ham Christian Centre
- 51°26′2.6772″N 0°18′48.7722″W
- Location: Lock Road, Ham, Richmond TW10 7LN
- Country: England
- Denomination: Evangelical Baptist
- Website: www.findachurch.co.uk/details/ham-greater-london/11445.htm/

History
- Former name: Ham Free Evangelical Church
- Status: Church
- Founded: 1928

Architecture
- Functional status: Active
- Completed: 1928

Specifications
- Materials: Brick and tile

Ham Christian Centre is an Evangelical church in Lock Road, Ham in the London Borough of Richmond upon Thames. It is a member of the South East Gospel Partnership.

== History ==
The church was built in 1928 as the Ham Free Evangelical Church. During the war the Pastor was Wilfred Sayer and he was followed by his brother and two sons. Services ceased in 1979 but it reopened after modernisation with Peter Dunn as minister. He was followed by Mark Farmer in 1988 and later by Mildred Howes and Bob McClure. It has operated as Emmanuel Church since the building was renovated in 1998 by the Duke Street Church, Richmond.

== Church activities ==
The church has a service on Sunday mornings. Prayer meetings are usually held in homes. .

== Community use ==
The church premises are also used by the community.
