= Thames Young Mariners =

Area of land in Ham, London

Thames Young Mariners Outdoor Education Centre
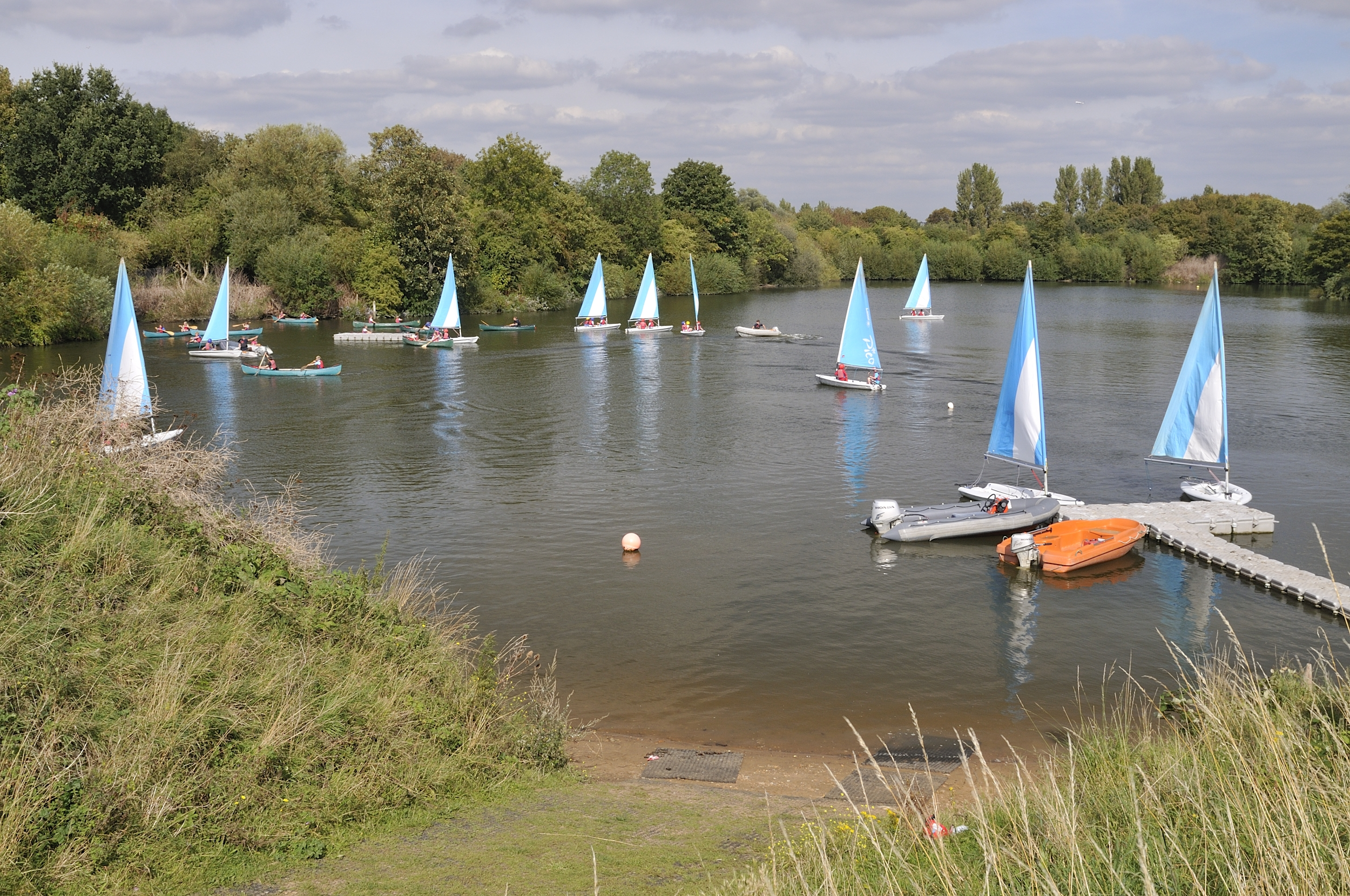
- The Thames Young Mariners Base Lagoon in use by a school group.

- Location within Greater London

General information
- Location: Thames Young Mariners Outdoor Education Centre, Riverside Drive, Ham, Richmond, Surrey, TW10 7RX, United Kingdom
- Coordinates: 51.4379888°N 0.3273206°W
- Owner: Surrey Outdoor Learning & Development

Website
- www.surreyoutdoorlearning.uk/facilities/thames-young-mariners

Thames Young Mariners is a 25-acre area of land situated in Ham. It includes the Thames Young Mariners Base Lagoon, which is a calm 10-acre lake connected to the River Thames by a lock. The site was established over 40 years ago and sits in between Richmond and Kingston.

Thames Young Mariners is surrounded by Ham Lands, which is a Local Nature Reserve of approximately 200 acres. Ham Lands is home to an array of wildlife across its various areas of woodland, scrub, grassland, and wetland, and also features one of Britain’s most well-preserved heaths.

== History ==
In the 1800s the Thames Young Mariners site housed three farms, all of which were owned by the Earl of Dysart. However, industrial and economic shifts over time saw agriculture in the area die out between the 1900s and 1950s in favour of housing and gravel extraction.

Much of the area in the Ham Lands has historically been used for gravel extraction and the Thames Young Mariners Base Lagoon is itself artificial; the lake is in fact an old gravel pit that has been filled in to serve as a public amenity since the disuse and selling off of the pits in 1952.

== Present ==
In the present day, Thames Young Mariners is owned by Surrey Outdoor Learning & Development, and hosts a range of outdoor learning programmes which have been officially recognised by the Royal Yachting Association and the British Canoe Union. Activities available at Thames Young Mariners include adventure/night walks, archery, bell boating, open canoeing, challenge courses, climbing, kayaking, mountain biking, orienteering, raft building, sailing, team tasks and woodland skills. Many of these activities can be altered to fit the needs of disabled groups.

Other facilities offered at the site includes hireable conference rooms, camping grounds, and a new Teepee village named ‘Buffalo Creek’, which allows visitors to build and maintain campfires. The campsite is not available for use by the general public and is for educational purposes only, including groups working towards their Duke of Edinburgh Award.

== Bibliography ==
- Pritchard, Evelyn (2000). Chave, Leonard (ed.). Ham and Petersham at 2000. Ham Amenities Group. pp. 2–28. ISBN 9780952209942.
