= Wayne Nash =

British baseball coach (born 1965)

Wayne Christie Nash (born November 26, 1965) is a former British baseball coach best known for establishing two time BBF National League champions, the Richmond Flames in the United Kingdom. Wayne started the Flames (then called the Fulham Flames) in the winter of 1991/92.

In May 2000, Wayne was appointed to the Great Britain baseball coaching staff and worked closely with their junior development program. In August of the same year he was announced as BBF coach of the year for his outstanding work with the Flames and the Great Britain Juniors. Wayne left the club in August 2001 after 9 seasons.

In 2004 Wayne was inducted into the Richmond Baseball and Softball Club Hall of Fame. He currently resides in Dortmund, Germany.
