= Grey Court School =

Location
- Ham Street; Richmond, London, TW10 7HN; England; 51.4388°N 0.3123°W

Information
- Type: Academy
- Established: 1956
- Department for Education URN: 138825 Tables
- Ofsted: Reports
- Chair of Governors: Julian Knott
- Headteacher: Christopher Rhodes
- Staff: circa 100
- Gender: Coeducational
- Age: 11 to 18
- Enrolment: circa 1,700
- Houses: Spartan, Roman, Trojan and Aztec
- Colour: Blue
- Website: https://www.greycourt.richmond.sch.uk/

Grey Court School is a mixed-sex high school academy in Ham, in the London Borough of Richmond upon Thames. In 2014, a new sixth form centre opened for Grey Court's founding sixth form students.

The school occupies a large acreage in Ham, with playing fields and tennis courts. The school's current head teacher is Christopher Rhodes.

== Performance ==
As with other schools, latest exam results and related data are published in the Department for Education's national tables.

== History ==
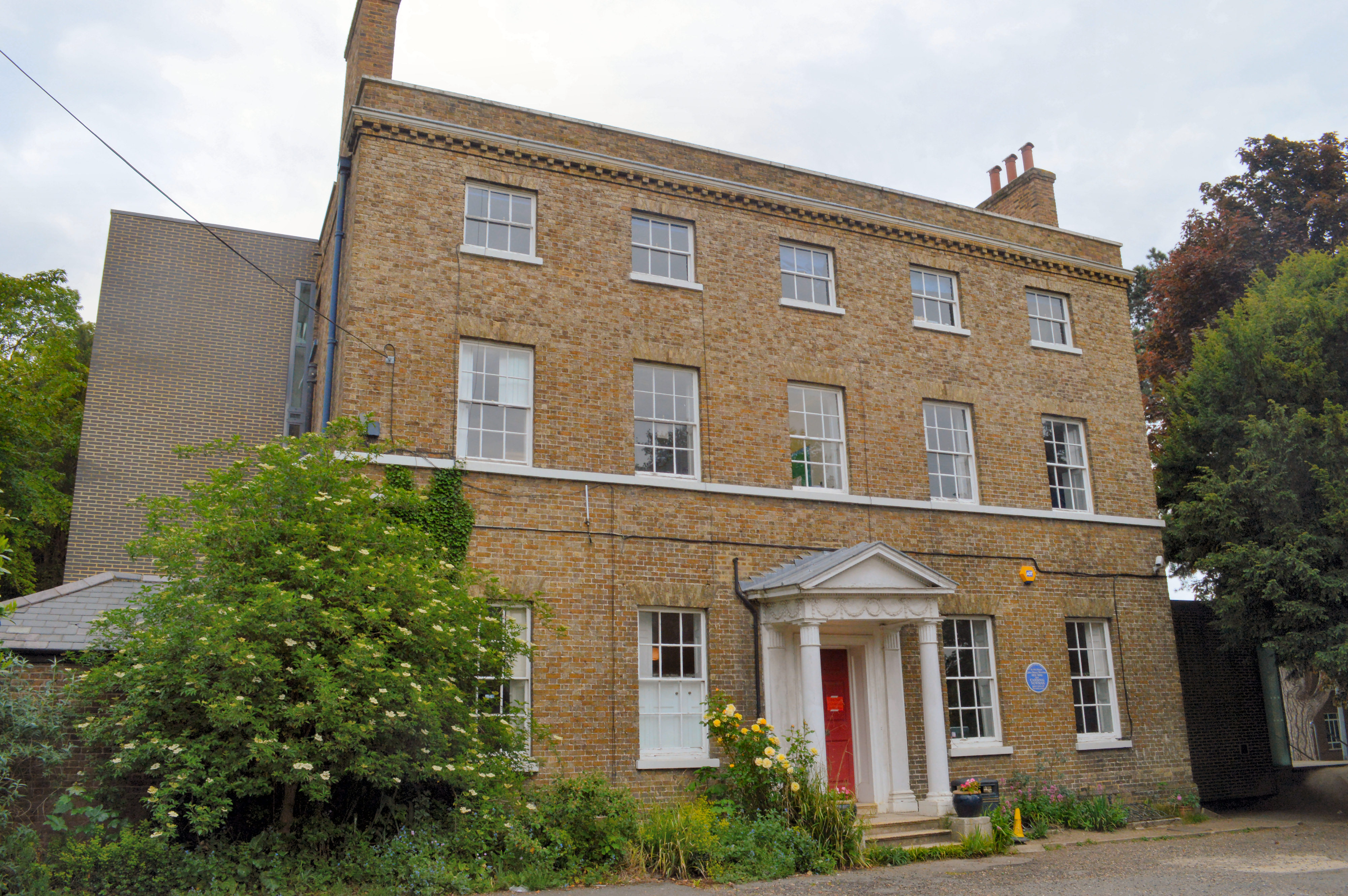
Newman House

The school was opened in 1956 to provide education for the children of the newly constructed estate. The school was built in the grounds of the Georgian Grey Court House from which it took its name. The house itself was renamed Newman House after Cardinal Newman, who lived there as a child in the early 19th century.

In 2013, and again in 2018, the school was rated 'Outstanding' by Ofsted, having previously been satisfactory. The sixth form was included in Ofsted's 2018 inspection. The school passed their 2024 inspection with an 'Outstanding' as well.

In March 2018, the sixth form building was named 'The True Building' after Lord True, Conservative politician and former Leader of Richmond upon Thames Council.

== Notable former pupils ==
- Declan Rice, professional footballer who plays for Arsenal F.C. and England
- Ruby Bentall, actress
- Andrew Gilligan, transport advisor to the Prime Minister, journalist and former London Cycling Commissioner
- Joseph Jones, professional footballer
