= Teddington Lock Footbridges =

Two footbridges on the River Thames in London

Teddington Lock Footbridge (South)
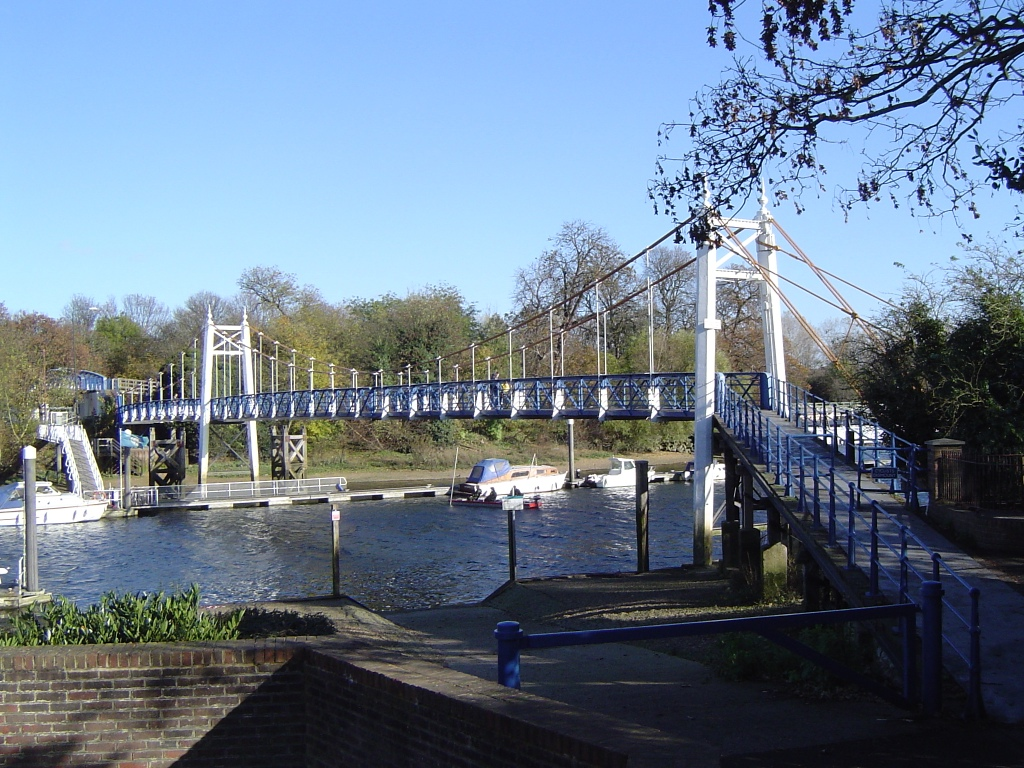
- The southern suspension bridge
- Coordinates: 51°25′51″N 0°19′18″W
- Carries: Footpath
- Crosses: River Thames
- Locale: Teddington
- Maintained by: Richmond upon Thames London Borough Council
- Heritage status: Grade II listed structure

Characteristics
- Design: Suspension
- Material: Iron

History
- Designer: G. Pooley
- Opened: 1889

Teddington Lock Footbridge (North)
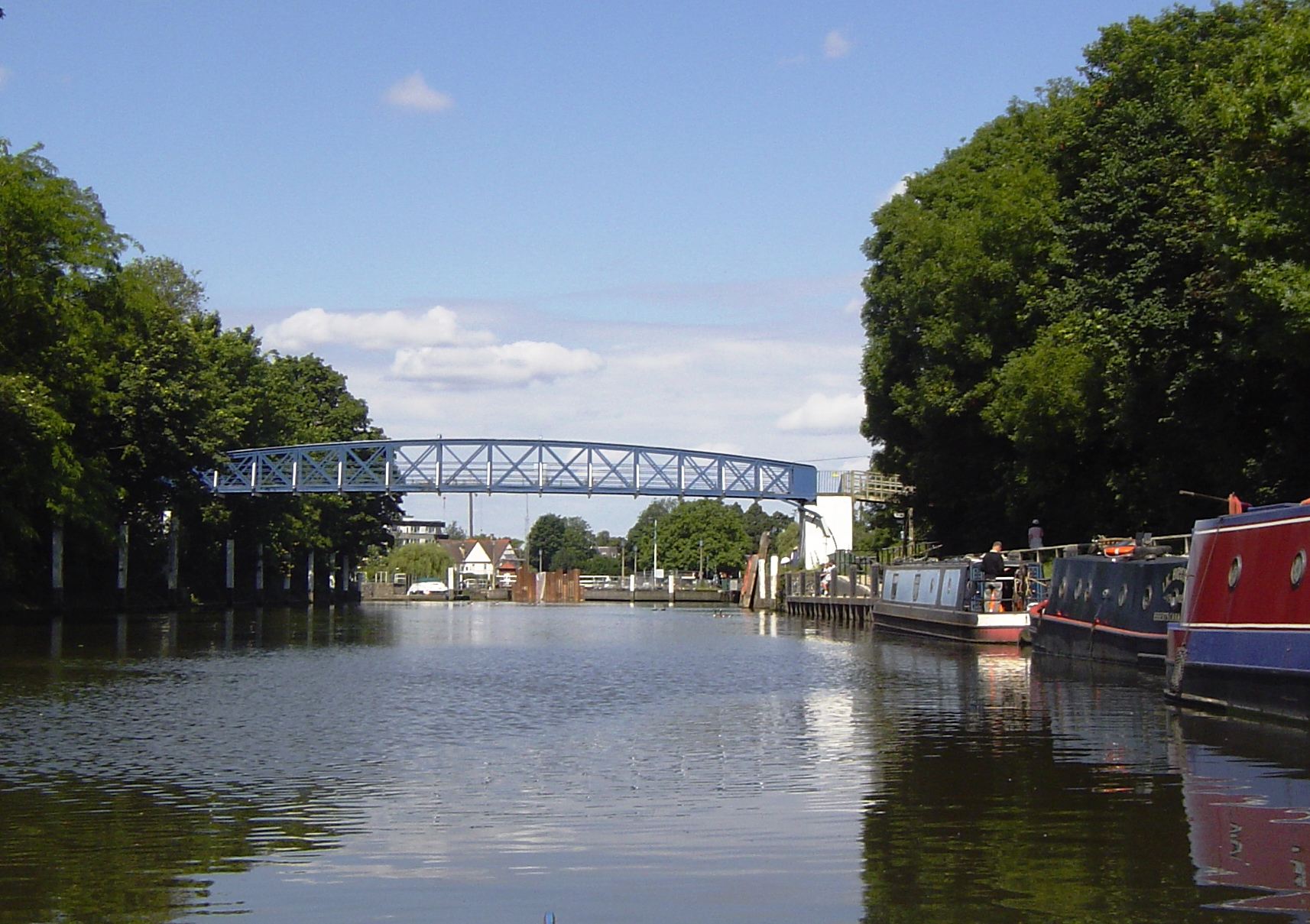
- The northern girder bridge
- Coordinates: 51°25′51″N 0°19′19″W
- Carries: Footpath
- Crosses: River Thames
- Locale: Ham
- Maintained by: Richmond upon Thames London Borough Council
- Heritage status: Grade II listed structure

Characteristics
- Design: Truss bridge
- Material: Iron
- Height: 18 feet 4 inches (5.59 m)

History
- Designer: G. Pooley
- Opened: 1889

Designations

Listed Building – Grade II
- Official name: Teddington Lock Footbridges
- Designated: 3 October 2005
- Reference no.: 1391392

The Teddington Lock Footbridges are two footbridges over the River Thames in England, situated just upstream of Teddington Lock at Teddington. There is a small island between the bridges.

The two footbridges were built between 1887 and 1889, funded by donations from local residents and businesses. They replaced a ferry which gave its name to Ferry Road at Teddington. The southern bridge consists of a suspension bridge crossing the weir stream and linking the island to Teddington. The northern bridge is an iron girder bridge crossing the lock cut and linking the island to Ham on the Surrey bank.

In recent years wooden ramps have been added to the approach to the bridge on the Ham side and to the middle part on the small island so that cycles and pushchairs etc. can avoid the steps up to and down from that section of the bridge.

From this point downstream the Thames Path runs on both sides of the river and upstream it runs on the Surrey side only.

The footbridges are both Grade II listed.

== See also ==
- Crossings of the River Thames
- List of bridges in London
- Locks and weirs on the River Thames

Next crossing upstream	River Thames	Next crossing downstream
Kingston Railway Bridge	Teddington Lock Footbridges	Hammerton's Ferry (pedestrian)
Next crossing upstream	Thames Path	Next crossing downstream
southern bank Kingston Bridge	Teddington Lock Footbridges	both banks all crossings to the Thames Barrier
