= Pinchin Johnson & Associates =

Pinchin Johnson & Associates Ltd
- Industry: Paint
- Founded: 1834
- Defunct: 1968
- Fate: Acquired
- Successor: Courtaulds
- Headquarters: 4 Carlton Gardens, St James's, London, England
- Products: Paint and coatings

Pinchin Johnson & Associates Ltd was a major supplier of paints and coatings to industry and consumers in the first half of the 20th century. It was an original constituent of the FT 30 index.

== History ==
The business was founded in 1834 as a producer of oils and turpentines in Silvertown, London. It grew by acquisition, buying up competitors such as Red Hand and Docker Brothers, with divisions in London, Birmingham and Yorkshire. It had larger operations in Europe, Australia, New Zealand and India, and smaller operations in the United States of America, Nigeria and the Far East.

== Demise of the business ==
In 1960, PJA was acquired by Courtaulds who, in 1968, merged it with the International Paint business they had acquired earlier in the year.
