= Petersham Common =

Petersham Common could refer to:

- Petersham Common Historic District
- Petersham Common, London
