= Hammerton's Ferry =

Pedestrian and cycle ferry service across the River Thames

Coordinates: 51.446652°N 0.314012°W

- London River Services
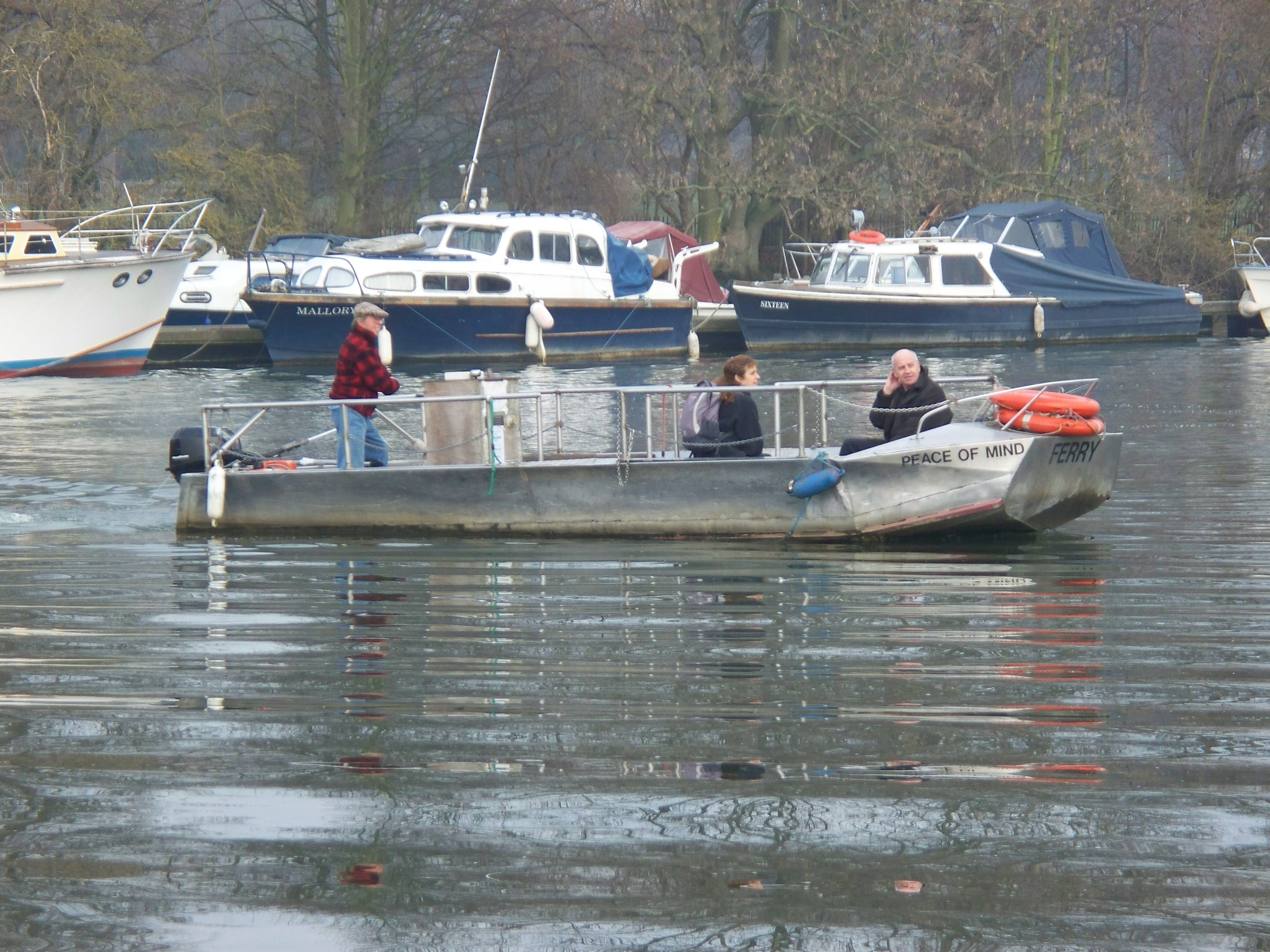
- Locale: London, England, UK
- Waterway: River Thames
- Transit type: Passenger ferry
- Owner: Francis Spencer
- Operator: Andrew Spencer
- Began operation: 1909
- No. of lines: 1
- No. of vessels: 1
- No. of terminals: 2
- Website: http://www.hammertonsferry.co.uk

Hammerton's Ferry is a pedestrian and cycle ferry service across the River Thames in the London Borough of Richmond upon Thames, London, England. The ferry links the river's northern bank near Marble Hill House in Twickenham with its southern bank near Ham House in Ham. It is one of only four remaining ferry routes in London not to be replaced by a bridge or tunnel.

== Historical background ==
Although ferries (and later bridges) had crossed the river to the east at Richmond since 1459 and to the west at Eel Pie Island since at least 1652, the lands to the south of the river at this point had historically been privately held by the Tollemache family (owners of Ham House) and were off limits to the public. Consequently, despite the distance from the nearest crossings there was little demand for cross-river services at this location. Additionally, the Tollemache family had licensing rights for the Twickenham Ferry at Eel Pie Island (sometimes known as Dysart's ferry after the family), and consequently had little interest in promoting a competing service. The Twickenham Ferry is a setting for some action in Little Dorrit by Charles Dickens.

== Walter Hammerton ==
In 1901 Marble Hill House on the north bank of the Thames and the surrounding park were purchased for public use and in 1902 the footpath on the southern bank near Ham House became a public right of way by Act of Parliament, resulting in increased passenger traffic in the area. In 1908 local resident Walter Hammerton began hiring out boats to leisure users from a boathouse opposite Marble Hill House, and in 1909 began to operate a regular ferry service across the river at this point using a 12-passenger clinker-built skiff, charging 1d per journey.

=== Legal challenge ===
In 1913, William Champion and Lord Dysart, operators of the nearby Twickenham Ferry, took legal action against Hammerton to remove his right to operate the ferry. Although Hammerton won the initial case, the judgment was reversed on appeal. Following considerable public interest in the case, a public subscription raised the funds for Hammerton to take the case to the House of Lords, who ruled in his favour on 23 July 1915.

The legal case resulted in considerable publicity for Hammerton, culminating in the release of the song "The Ferry to Fairyland" celebrating the case. ("Fairyland", in this case, referring to Marble Hill House, recently purchased by the London County Council for public enjoyment.)

In 1947 Hammerton retired after 38 years of operating the ferry, leaving the ferry and boathouse to Sandy Scott. The business had been given a royal warrant in the early 20th century, which Hammerton kept in the family even after the ferry and boathouse were under new management. The drummer Phil Collins is the grandson of the original proprietor, Walter Hammerton, and is said to be in possession of the original warrant.

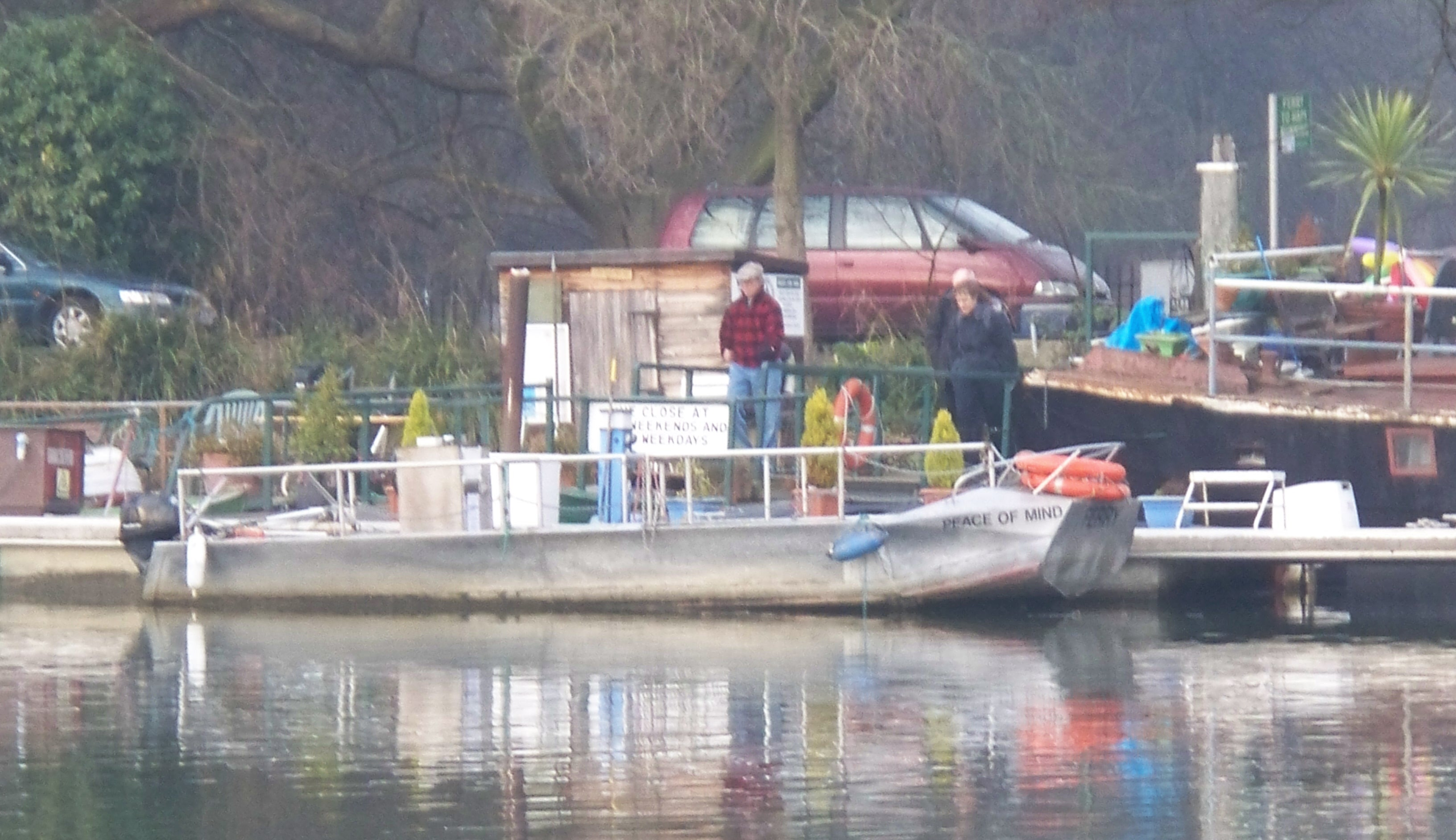
Passengers boarding from the north bank

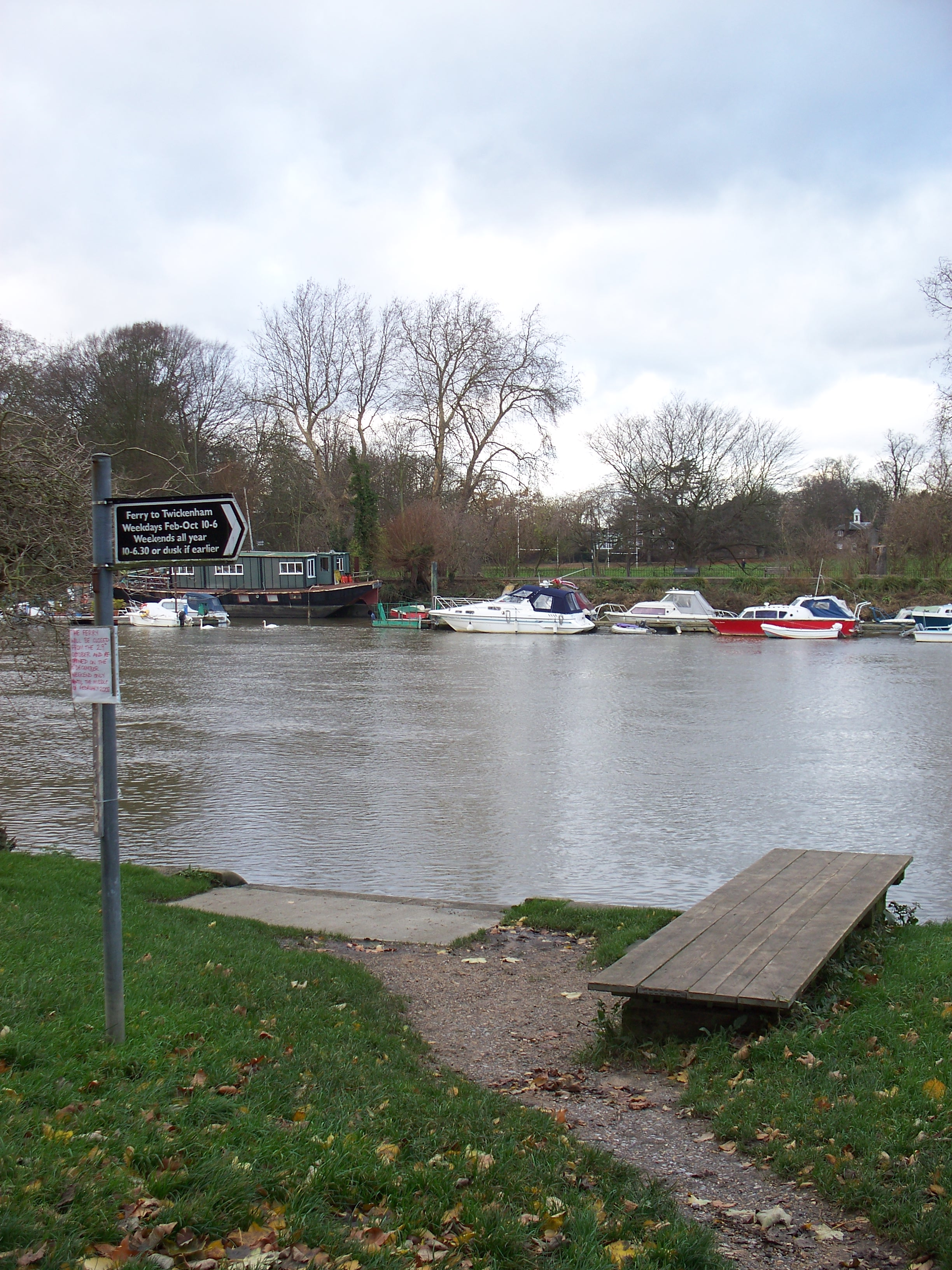
The jetty on the south bank

== Current operation ==
The ferry is currently owned by Francis Spencer and operated by Stan Rust. The current ferry, Peace of Mind, was designed and built by Thanetcraft Limited in South Wales in 1997. Hammerton's original wooden skiff is now on display at the Museum of London Docklands.

The ferry currently operates between a floating boathouse on the north bank of the Thames and on the south bank, a rudimentary jetty used at high tide and a set of stairs in the embankment used at low tide. The boathouse is also in use as a private mooring for leisure craft. Weather permitting, the ferry operates on weekends year-round, and weekdays between February and October. As well as the ferry service, rowboats, canoes and motorboats can also be hired from the boathouse.

In July 2007 the ferry briefly made headlines when owner Francis Spencer saved from drowning a woman found floating in the Thames. After the rescue, the woman left the scene and was never identified.

The ferry is just downstream of the finish line of the Great River Race and is on the course of the Twickenham Regatta. As the ferry has right of way over rowed craft, the races have to be carefully timed to ensure that the ferry does not interfere with their running.

== Image gallery ==
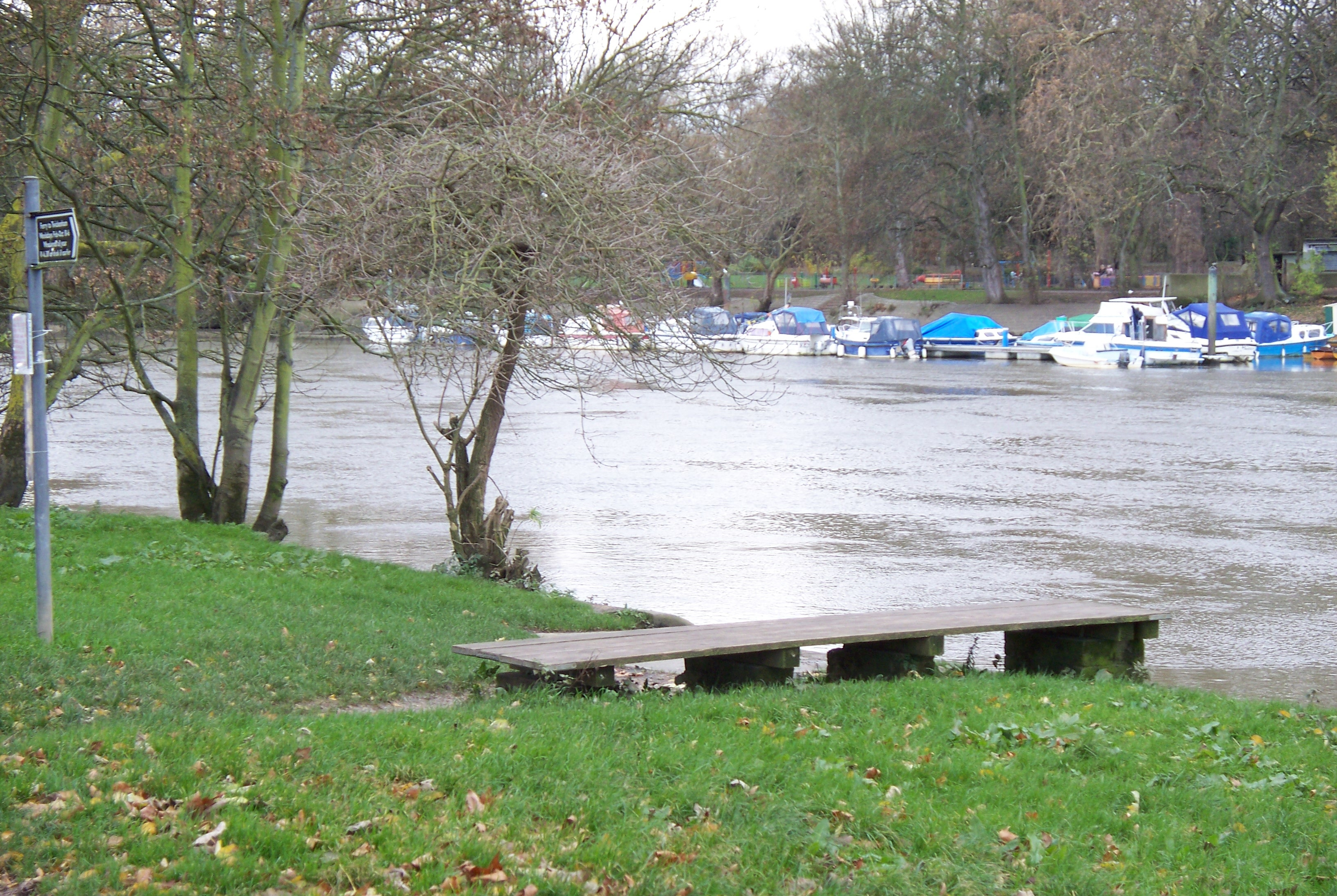
View across the river from the Ham side, showing the wooden jetty and the private boats moored at the boathouse on the north bank

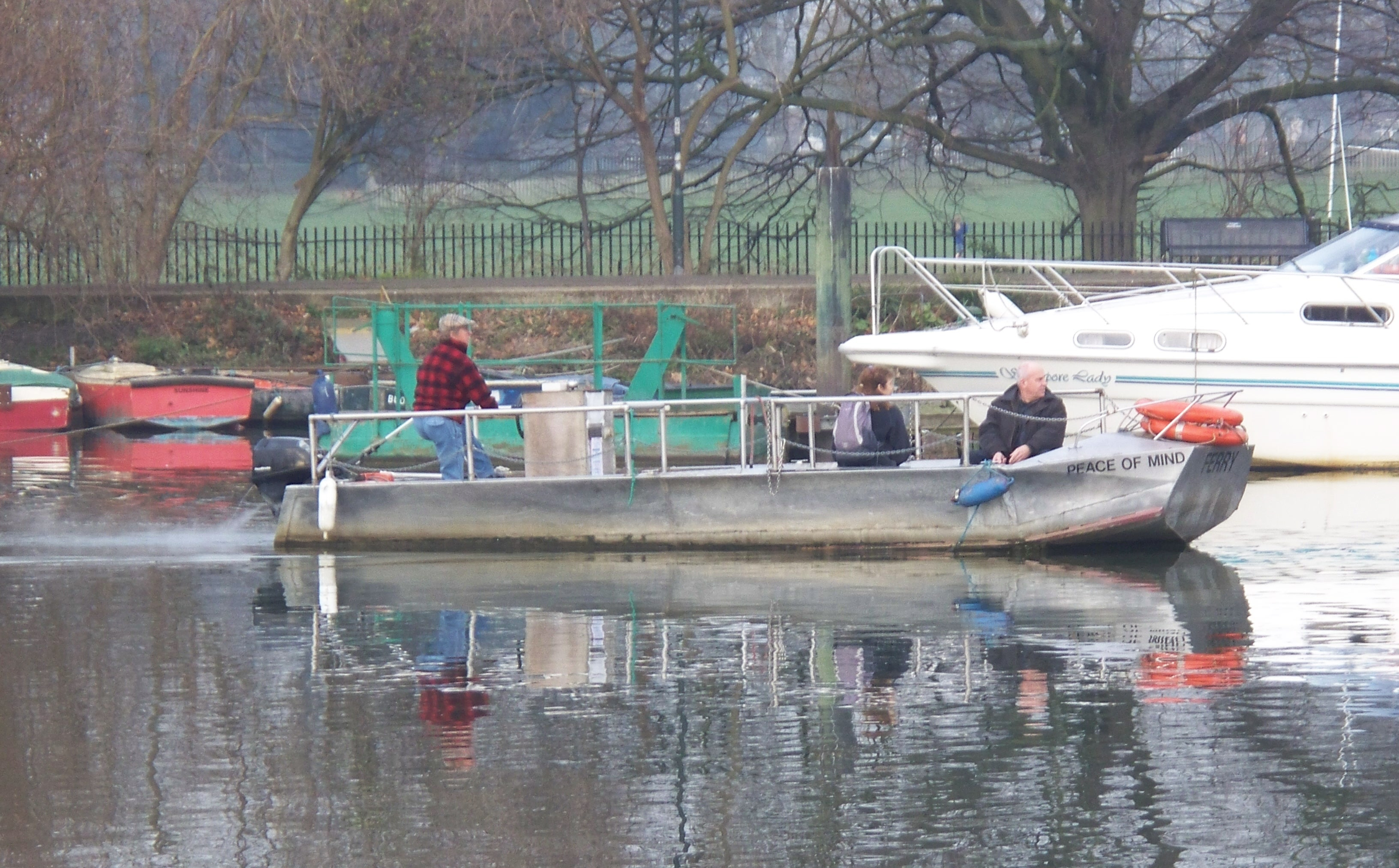
The ferry departing from the north bank

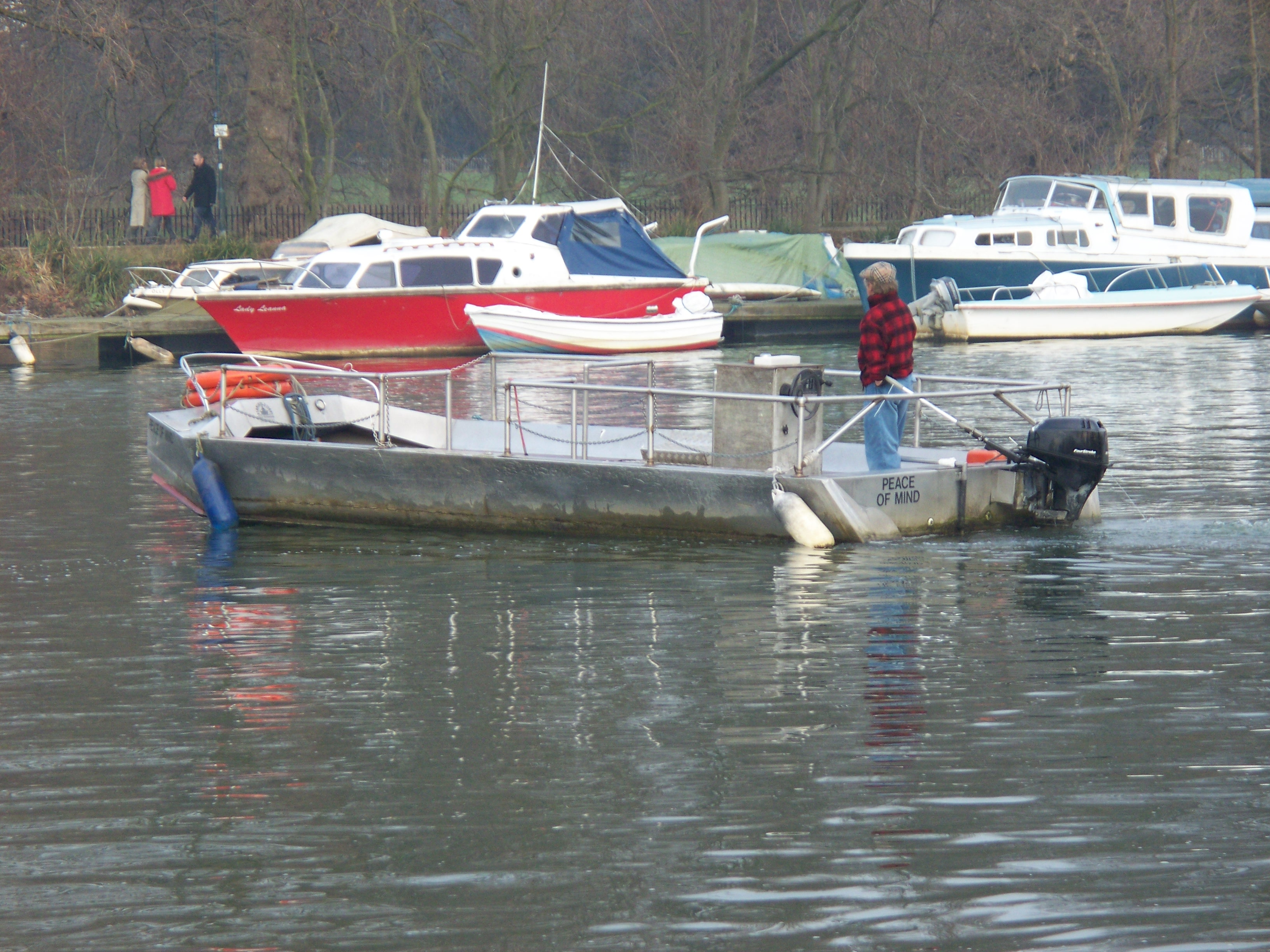
The ferry running empty from the south to north bank to collect passengers

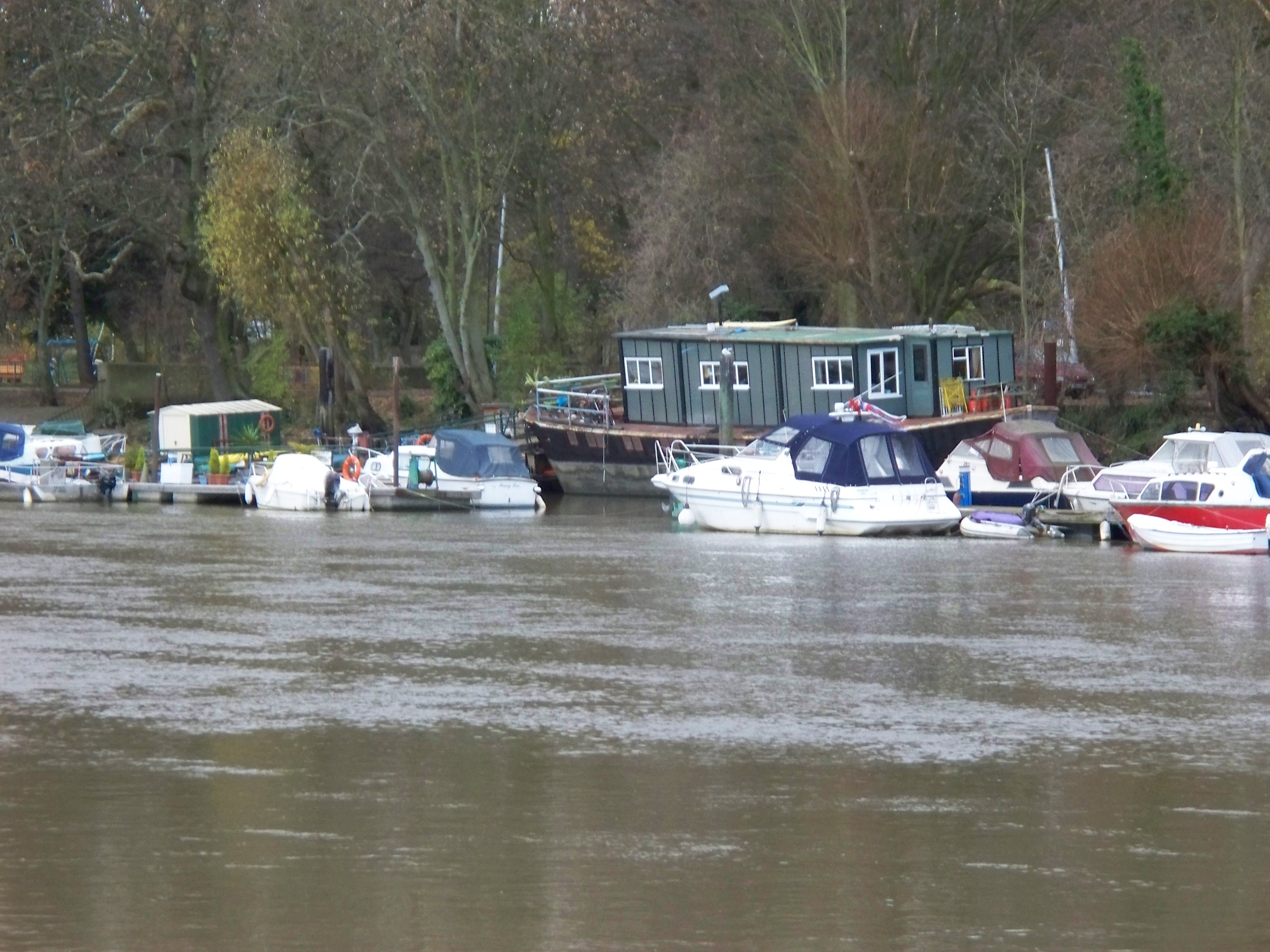
The boathouse on the north bank

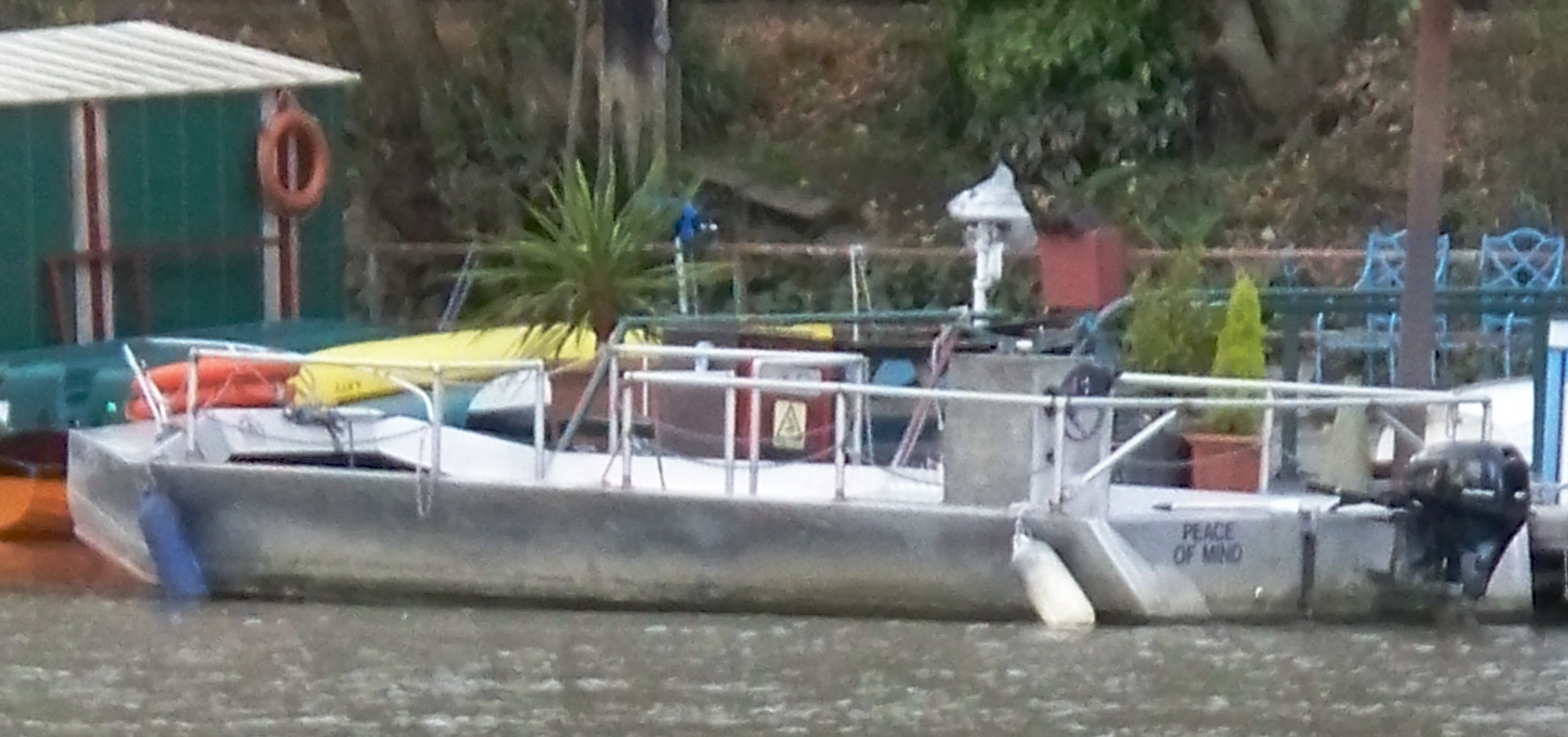
Peace of Mind moored at the boathouse

== See also ==
- Crossings of the River Thames
