= Emily Hornby =

English travel writer and mountaineer

Emily Hornby (1833–1906) came from a wealthy Liverpool family who became a distinguished mountaineer and through her journals, published after her death, a travel writer.

== Early life ==
She was born in December 1833 in Liverpool where her father, Thomas Hornby MA (1801–1890), was curate of St. George's Liverpool (1832–47) and later vicar of Walton On The Hill, Lancashire (1847–1890). Her mother was Margaret Rigby (1800–1857). She had three younger sisters, Mary Louisa Hornby (1835–1913), Edith Agnes Hornby (1839–1894) and Frances Margaret Hornby (1841–1924), who would often accompany her on her travels.

== Mountaineering ==
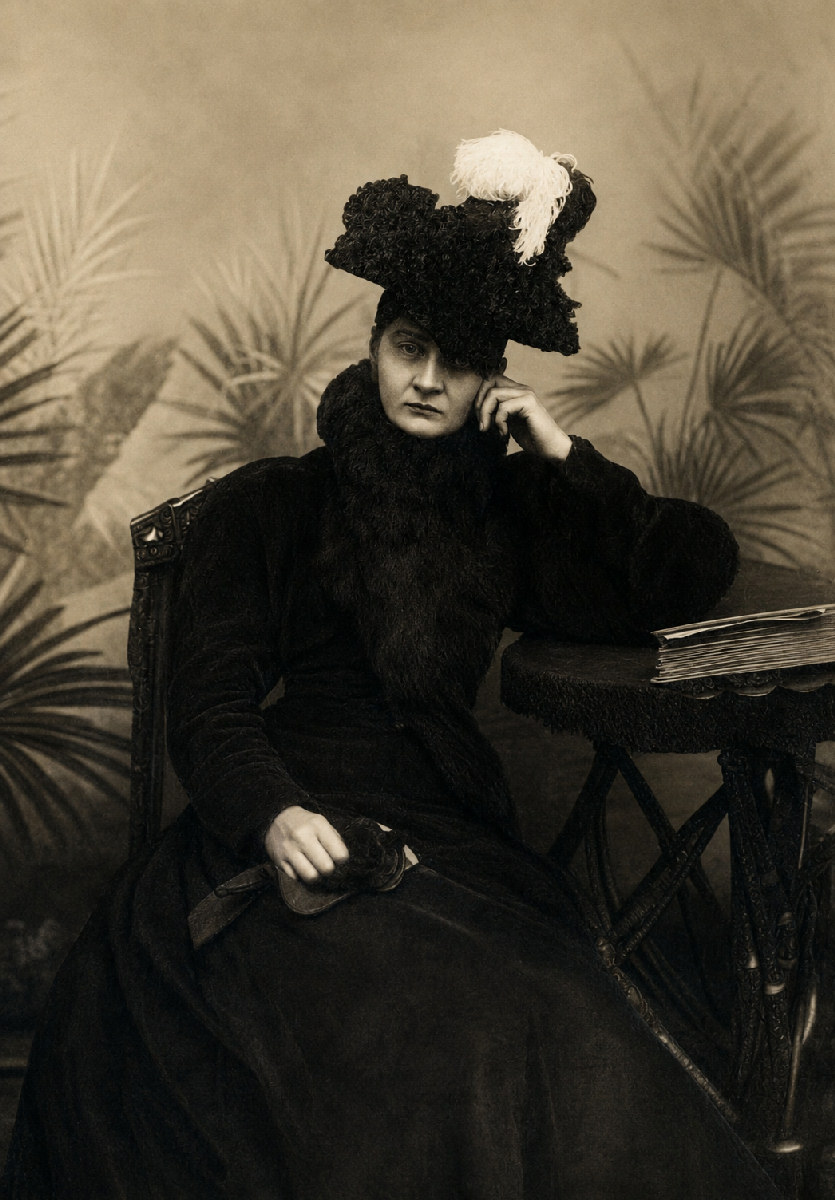
Emily Hornby, from A Tour in the Alps of Dauphiné

Between 1873 and 1895 she was mountaineering in the Alps and Dolomites, including Mont Blanc (4807m), Monte Rosa (4634m), Eiger (3967m) and Jungfrau (4158m). She was the eighth woman to climb the Matterhorn (4,478m) in 1875, climbing with Alois Pollinger. She climbed with Pollinger in 1875–1877 and in 1879. In 1890 Emily was climbing in the Dolomites. A record of her letters and journals was published in 1907 as Mountaineering Records.

From Ascent of the Titlis (1873). "When we got to the glacier we were roped together, the glacier was most easy to cross, but afterwards we had a steep slope of very slippery snow with no footing at all. We struggled up breathless, and it was fortunately not very long, and afterwards it was not so steep, and there was more footing. It was bliss when we saw the cairn at the top, and we finally got there soon after seven, six hours and a quarter from the Triibsee. I am sure I should have been nearly an hour less about it but for the darkness. Five and a half hours is the time was given in Baedeker, so it was only three quarters of an hour more after all. It was a splendid panorama view, but nothing, in my mind, to the one from the Schilthorn."

== Travel ==
In 1899 and 1901 she travelled to Petra and Sinai, sailing on the Nile in 1905 with her sisters Mary and Frances. Her book of her travels to Sinai include watercolour sketches by Frances. The journal of her travels up the Nile were edited by her sister Mary and published posthumously in 1906 and reprinted in 1908 with drawings by Frances. Her Nile journal ends unfinished; she returned home to Ham and died of pneumonia shortly afterwards.

Her journals had not been written for publication and describe not only the places visited but also the experiences of travelling. On her arrival at Petra she wrote that:

Every corner was covered with mouldings and bas relief, and all quite perfect except the one fallen pillar, which is lying embedded in the grass. We went up steps into the temple, nothing inside, but on each side of the portico a niche, with a beautiful carved canopy. It was lovely, and too extraordinary to see such a perfect piece of workmanship in this lonely place, which has been unknown for centuries.

== Personal life ==
After the death of their father in 1890 three of the sisters, Emily, Edith and Frances, left Walton. Mary, who had trained as a nurse, remained in Liverpool. In about 1893 they moved to Ham, Surrey, where they rented The Manor House. In 1903 Emily represented the National Union of Women's Suffrage Societies in a meeting at the House of Commons.

After the death of Emily in 1906, Frances lived briefly in Evelyn Road before buying Orford House on Ham Common in 1907. She possibly painted the Egyptian artwork discovered in the summer house in 1936. Ham and Petersham as it Was has a photograph of Miss Hornby's Palladium car and chauffeur, Arthur Whiting, at Orford House.

Emily died on 13 April 1906 (Good Friday) at The Manor House, Ham, Surrey, leaving £67,774 in her will. After cremation at Brookwood Cemetery her ashes were interred at St Andrew's Church, Ham.

== Books ==
- A Tour in the Alps of Dauphiné and A Tour in the Carpathians (1906). Liverpool: J. A. Thompson
- Sinai and Petra: The Journals of Emily Hornby in 1899 and 1901 (1907). London: J. Nisbet; Liverpool: J. A. Thompson
- Mountaineering Records (1907). Edited by M L Hornby. Liverpool: J. A. Thompson
- A Nile Journal (1908). Liverpool: J. A. Thompson
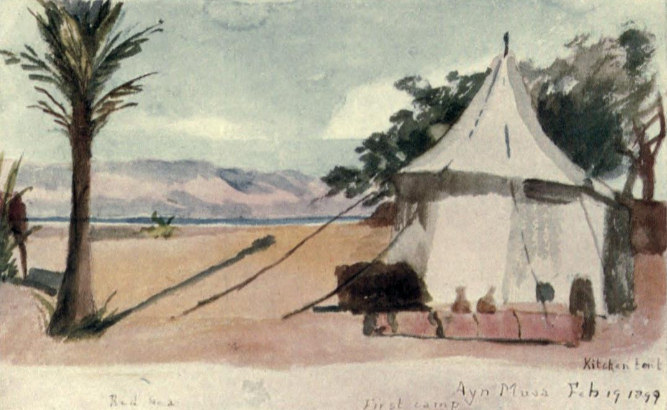
Ain Moussa camp, Sinai, 1899

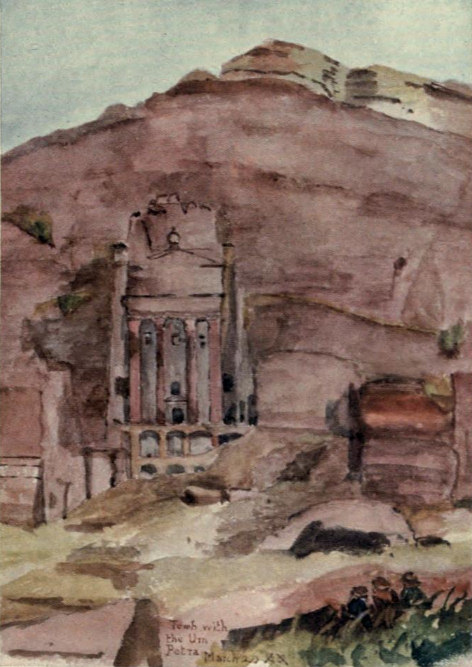
Petra, 1901

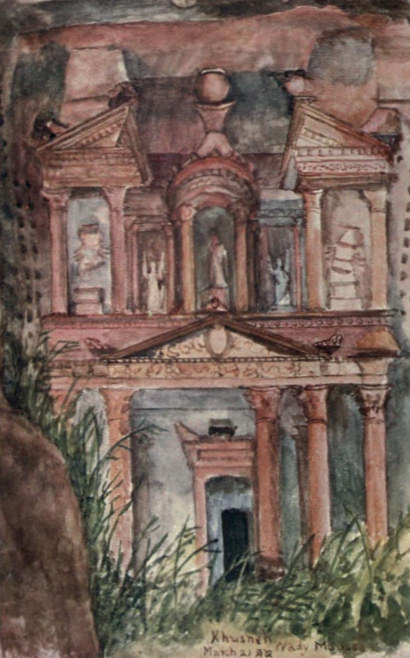
Petra, 1901

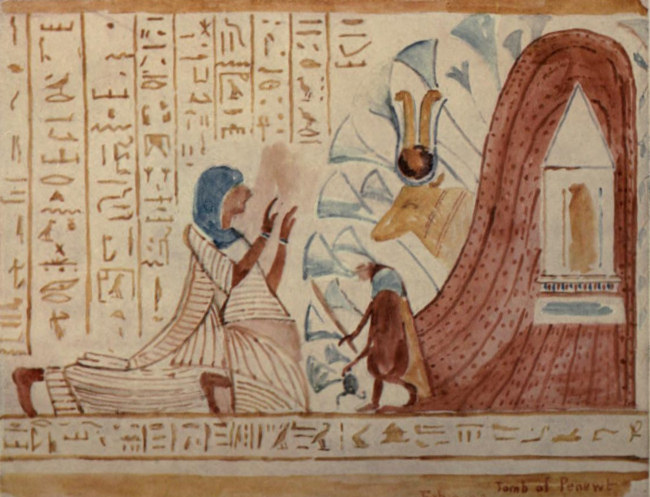
Tomb of Pennut, 1905
