= Ham and Petersham Cricket Club =

Coordinates: 51.432889°N 0.306633°W

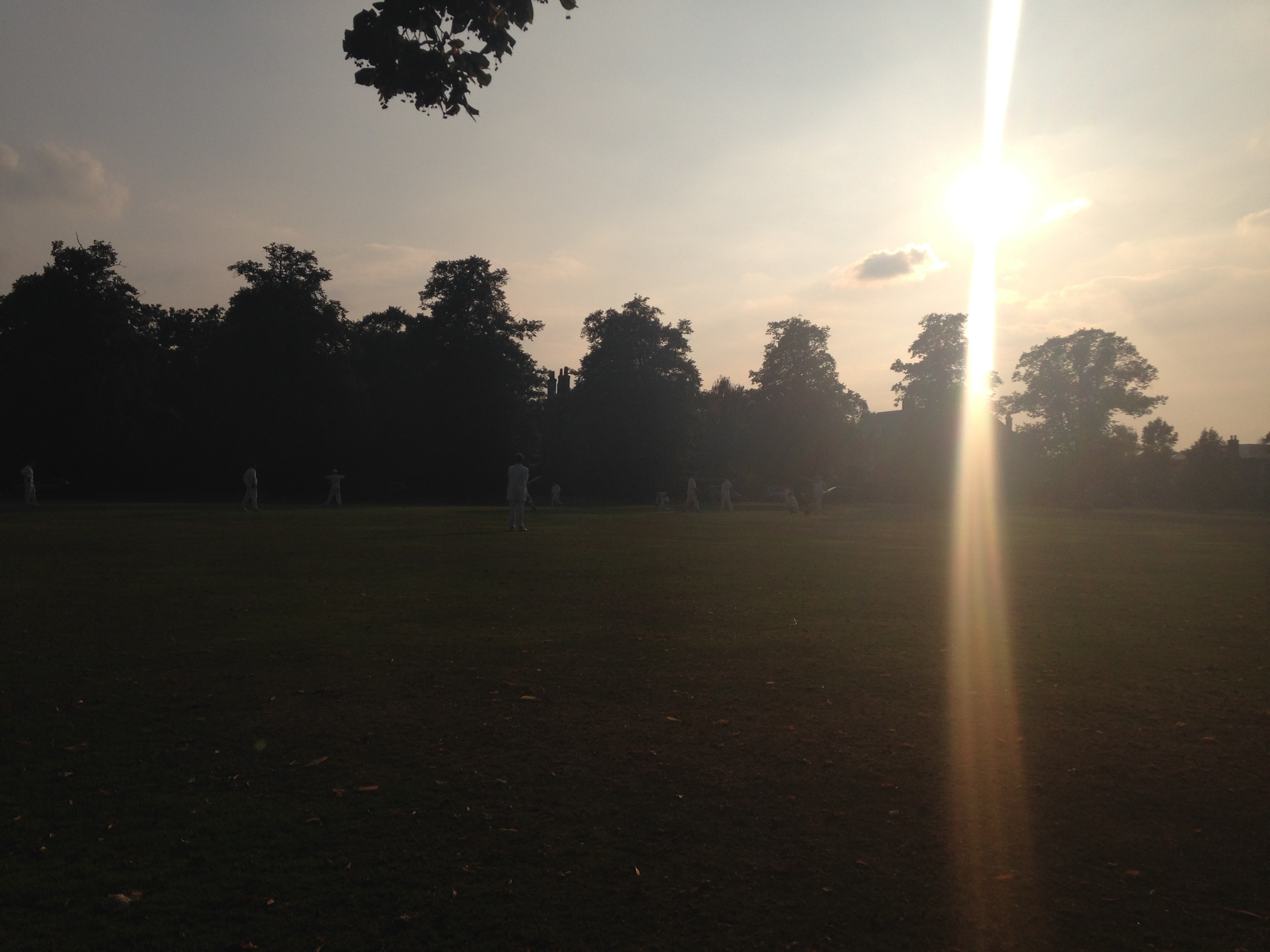
- Ham Common at Sunset.

Team information
- Established: 1815
- Home venue: Ham Common, London

History
- Notable players: Shane Warne; Bill Brockwell

Ham and Petersham Cricket Club was established in 1815. In 2015 the cricket club celebrated its bicentenary.

== Foundation ==
Cricket was originally played on Ham Common by the Albion Club in 1815. During the 19th century the Albion Club became known as Ham Albion. By 1891 the club was referred to as Ham and Petersham Cricket Club and this name has been retained up until the present day.

== Location ==
The home ground, Ham Common, is located in Ham which borders the village of Petersham. It is surrounded by some notable houses, the edge of Richmond Park, Cassel Hospital and two pubs, The Hand and Flower and The New Inn. At one end of the ground is a pond; legend has it that the only player ever to hit the ball in the pond, a distance of 170 m (560 ft) was Gary Sobers.

== The clubhouse ==
Up until the Second World War a tent was set up for the players to change in. Caricatures of Jack Hobbs and Fred Burgess (the first XI captain in 1913) were drawn on the side of the tent. In 1927 a clubhouse was erected on Ham Common but the club was soon forced to take it down by Ham Urban District Council as it is common land. In 1968 the committee raised funds to build a clubhouse adjacent to the Hand and Flower pub. In 2013, after another fundraising effort, a new clubhouse was built and was opened by England and Surrey cricketer Alec Stewart on 17 April 2013.

== Famous players ==
Some famous cricketers have graced the field on Ham Common, including Shane Warne, Imran Khan, Gary Sobers, Tom Richardson, Jack Hobbs, Andy Sandham, Bert Strudwick, Peter May, Alec Bedser and Bill Brockwell. Celebrity players have included Michael Parkinson, Roy Castle, Tim Theakston of Theakston Brewery and Tim Rice.

== Great club players ==
Bill Brockwell, who played for England and Surrey in the 19th century, was probably the finest cricketer to regularly play for the club. He lived at Rajinda Cottage on Ham Common and was the vice-president of the club prior to World War I.

The best player of the 20th century was Richard Harrison, a quick bowler who batted at number 4. Harrison retired from cricket in 1999.

== Score books ==
The earliest surviving scorecard dates back to a match between Ham Albion and Twickenham Cricket Club that took place on Tuesday 13 July 1841. Ham Albion won by an innings and 87 runs. A scorecard from a match played against Brentford Cricket Club in 1855 also exists. The local newspaper, The Surrey Comet, recorded at the time that "at the conclusion of the game the players partook of an excellent supper at The New Inn, which was supplied by Mr Adam Goddard in his usual style and reflected credit on the worthy host".

== Score book archive ==
Ham and Petersham Cricket Club Archive – 1978 to 1985

Ham and Petersham Cricket Club Archive – 1986 to 2009

== Classic matches ==
=== Mackie's 9 and Claridge's 8 ===
On 30 May 1982 J Mackie took 9 for 26 as Thames Ditton Old Boys achieved a total of 62. In reply Ham and Petersham could only manage 33, with J Mackie top scoring with 15 not out. The very next match, against Chertsey, J Mackie did not play. Ham and Petersham scored 198 and bowled Chertsey out for 14 with P Claridge taking 8 for 6.

=== Clarkie's Hundred ===
On 15 July 1984 the club's Chairman and opening batsman, Peter Clarke, scored a 100 not out. He would score over 500 runs that season.

=== Bobby Jordan 's debut ===
On 25 August 1985 Bobby Jordan made his debut for Ham and Petersham. With line and length swing bowling he took 7 wickets for 45 runs. On 3 September 2017, 32 years later, having been Chairman of Ham and Petersham for over a decade, Jordan played his last match, still bowling line and length swing and still taking wickets.

== Yorkshire tour ==
In May 1979 the club went on its first tour to Yorkshire. This was arranged through former players and Yorkshire residents, Andrew Dallas and Tim Theakston. The Yorkshire Tour match was played against Theakston Brewery. In the 20 overs a side match Theakston Brewery 141 for 3 beat Ham and Petersham 95 all out In 2020, during the COVID-19 pandemic the club held a virtual Yorkshire Tour, complete with a virtual cricket match and virtual pub crawl. The tour continued every year up until 2022. .

== Bicentennial year ==
The 2015 saw the club celebrate its 200th year. The anniversary was marked by six special celebrations.

- A cricket tour of India
- A cricket tour of Yorkshire
- A match against a celebrity Bunbury side, where Harry Judd and Nick Farr-Jones opened the batting for the opposition.
- A match against Surrey County Cricket Club legends
- A match at Lords
- A dinner dance at The Oval, with special guests Michael Parkinson, Simon Mann of Test Match Special and former England player and selector, Geoff Miller.

== Club Presidents ==
- 1897–1919 J. W. Hacker
- 1920 A. Mackenzie Hay
- 1921–1924 Gerald Dumas
- 1925 Brigadier H. Champion
- 1926 Grey Jones
- 1927–1931 E. B. Raikes
- 1932–1935 Colonel C. Black
- 1936–1940 Lieutenant Colonel A. Bromhead
- 1955–1959 Major W. McGrath
- 1959–1967 Philip Carr
- 1968–1971 Horace Emery
- 1972–1978 Frank Vickery
- 1978–1998 Bill Peer
- 1998–present Simon Penniston

== 1st XI Captains ==
1st XI Captains
Decade	00	01	02	03	04	05	06	07	08	09
1900s	John Davis	John Davis	J. Brockwell	Arthur Day	Arthur Day	John Davis	E.H. Foster	E.H. Foster	J.F. Warren	John Davis
1910s	John Charman	John Charman	Fred Burgess	Fred Burgess	None	None	None	None	None	Bert Fallowfield
1920s	Bert Fallowfield	Bert Fallowfield	Bert Fallowfield	Bert Fallowfield	Bert Fallowfield	Bert Fallowfield	Bert Fallowfield	Bert Fallowfield	Bert Fallowfield	Bert Fallowfield
1930s	Bert Fallowfield	Bert Fallowfield	Bert Fallowfield	George Davis	Bernard Tickner	David Warren	David Warren	Tom Finch	Bert Fallowfield	Bert Fallowfield
1940s	Bert Fallowfield	None	None	None	None	None	None	None	None	None
1950s	None	Francis Voysey	Edward Matkin	Edward Matkin	Edward Matkin	Edward Matkin	Ron Langford	Ron Langford	F. Bottams	Roger Grant
1960s	Roger Grant	John Peer	Mike Butterfield	Mike Butterfield	Mike Butterfield	John and Christopher Peer	David Shrimpton	David Shrimpton	David Shrimpton	David Shrimpton
1970s	David Shrimpton	David Shrimpton	Barry Rossitter	Peter Kelsall	Graham Forsyth	Graham Forsyth	Graham Forsyth	Howard Bartley	Barry Rossitter	Mark Neal
1980s	Mark Neal	Mark Neal	Philip Lindner	Alan Kelsall	Alan Kelsall	Michael Long	Michael Long	Michael Long	Michael Long	Brian Pitfield
1990s	Brian Pitfield	Brian Pitfield	Nick Robinson	Nick Robinson	Nick Robinson	Nigel Milton	Nigel Milton	Richard Harrison	Richard Harrison	Richard (Biffa) Fuller
2000s	Richard (Biffa) Fuller	Russell Taylor	Russell Taylor	Steve Tebb	Steve Tebb	Steve Tebb	Steve Tebb	Paul McKenzie	Paul McKenzie	Paul Burnham
2010s	Paul Burnham	Paul Burnham	Paul Burnham	Paul Burnham	Chas Warlow	Paul Burnham	Paul Burnham	Paul Burnham	Hassan Kani	Paul Burnham
2020s	Paul Burnham	Paul Burnham	Rupert Reddish	Nishant Parekh	Nishant Parekh	Asher Khan				

== League Cricket ==
Since the early 2000s, Ham and Petersham Cricket Club has played in the Surrey Cricket League. In 2017 Ham and Petersham Cricket Club switched to the Fuller's Brewery Surrey County League.

== Bibliography ==
- Philpot, Peter. A History of Ham and Petersham Cricket Club 1815–1985, 1985
- Twickenham Cricket Club 1833–1933: The First One Hundred Years, Twickenham: Walker and Co.,1933
- Club Cricket Conference Handbook, first edition, 1915
