= Hardwicke House, Ham Common =

Building in London, England

Coordinates: 51°26′11″N 0°18′23″W

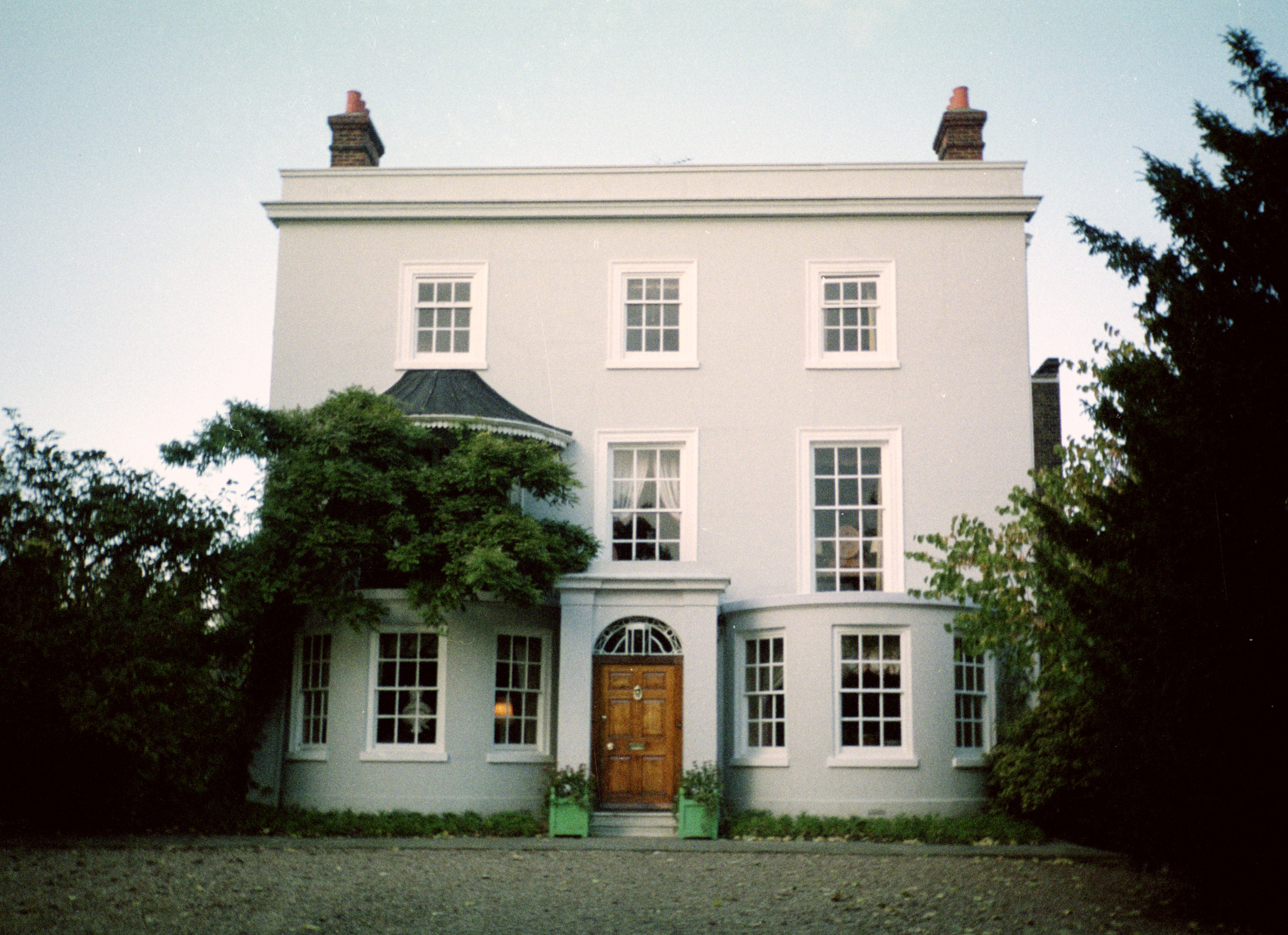
Hardwicke House

Hardwicke House is a Grade II listed house facing Ham Common in the London Borough of Richmond upon Thames.

== Description ==
It was built in the Queen Anne architectural style (1688), double-fronted with three storeys, bow windows on the ground floor with a verandah on the left and a projecting porch.

== History ==
Hardwick House (as it was originally named) was designed in 1688 by Thomas Tryon, merchant, author and early advocate of animal rights and vegetarianism, probably as a country residence as his main address was in Hackney.

John and Elizabeth Anne Brome are recorded here in the 1830s and 1841.

About 1844 it was bought by John Lewis Cox, the first printer of The Builder in 1842 and master of the Worshipful Company of Stationers in 1848. His family retired here and in 1851 they had a cook, lady's maid, housemaid and a groom.

From 1851 to 1868 the house was owned by Sir John Ralphe Milbanke, Bt., as an investment. On the 1861 census the house was occupied by Elizabeth Busk, a foreign merchant.

In 1913 Mary Elizabeth Sydney Pigott, only daughter of Sir Thomas Pigott, 2nd Bt., died here. Alex Koch de Gooreynd settled in Hardwicke House in 1921.

Hugh Grosvenor, 2nd Duke of Westminster was living here in 1939.

== Filming ==
It was used in Waitrose's Christmas advert in 2025.
