= Ann Rolfe =

English poet and author (1789–1850)

Ann Rolfe (c1789–1850) was an English author and poet.

== Early life ==
She was born Ann Button (or Batton) about 1789, either in Surrey or possibly in Suffolk. Not much is known for certain about her early life. (Note: She was 61 when she died in 1850 and on the 1841 Census her county of birth is shown as Surrey. However she has connections to both Suffolk and Essex.)

== Author ==
Her poems were first published by subscription in 1824 as Miscellaneous Poems for a Winter's Evening. In the preface she notes that some poems were from "a very early period of life". The others were much later and written for her two sons. One of her poems is about South Green Cottage, Essex, and another is about Wanstead House, which is now in the London Borough of Redbridge but was then in Essex. She also thanks her friends in Essex who subscribed to the publishing of the work. Many poems are personal, such as 'A Lady's Distress on her Son's going to India' about her son leaving for India and another is 'Addressed to my two Children at the Tomb of their Father, in 1822'.

She went on to write two novels with settings in East Anglia: Choice and No Choice (1825) and The Will; or, Twenty-one Years (1828).

In the 1830s she contributed poetry to The Ladies' Pocket Magazine and Time's Telescope; or, A Complete Guide to the Almanack. Other poems included 'Stanzas on the Tomb Stone in Ditton Church Yard', 'Old Friends', 'On the Anniversary of the Death of Sidney Waller Plumb' (1834), 'An Elegy on the death of John Thomas Sutton' and 'Lines to M.G.P. at Madras in the East Indies' (1835). Her poems were also published in local newspapers. 'Lines, on receiving the Bury Post' was published in 1839, giving her address as Selby House Farm. In 1842 she published 'Our friends who are gone', and in 1843 'My dead son'. She also contributed longer pieces, such as the Gothic novella Roderick, or the Magic Tower, a Tale of Former Times (1832).

.

SPRING

The loveliness of leaves and flowers,
The roseate tints of Flora's bowers,
Where the young butterfly reposes,
Or sports, and frisks away, 'midst roses,
Its short liv'd hour.

The balm and sweets of landscapes fair,
The symphonies that fill the air,
The earth that teems with future stores,
The merry hills and genial shores,
Without a care.

The sunny skies where seraphs meet,
Where Jove himself hath fixed his seat,
Above, below, in space profound,
Through all creations's mystic round,
Divine, complete.

All, all resume their wonted powers,
Their garlands fair—their fertile showers,
Their jubilees—their songs of love,
Their festive scenes in wood and grove,
And myrtle bowers.

They shout with joy—with joy to see
Their own bright mirthful harmony,
Their paradise of blooms and hues,
Their fairy seats of flowers and dews,
Fresh, gay, and free.

Up Spring, 'tis thou, voluptuous queen,
That brings the zephyr—decks the green,
That gives a radiance to the skies,
A glory dazzling to the eyes,
And joys serene.

'Tis thou that bid'st the streamlets flow,
Where nectared sweets and blossoms grow,
With holiest feelings shed'st around
A fragrance pure,—for love hath crown'd
Thy youthful brow.

Up Spring, for 'tis thy silvery wand
Stretch'd far and wide o'er sea and land,
That rules the golden orb of day,
Who, midst his myriads, speeds his way,
At thy command.

The vanquished storms all gone to rest,
The young buds playing on thy vest,
The thrilling strains so soft, so sweet,
With each delicious joy we meet,
Soothe ev'ry breast.

Up Spring and hear thy praises sung,
And well may'st thou with heart and tongue,
In concert join—thou ne'er canst fade
Whether in sunshine or in shade,
Thou still art young,

Short is thy visit—but thy bloom
Sheds not its glory for the tomb;
Sister of all the cherubims
That raise their anthems and their hymns
Beyond earth's gloom.

We hail thee then a seraph here,
Sent forth man's feeling heart to cheer,
Who, unlike thee, must soon decay,
And midst his pleasures pass away
To darkness drear.

Ye fair that boast a youthful grace,
Excelling charms of form and face,
Enjoy what heaven hath made sublime,
For dark, insidious, withering time,
Steals on apace.

Grieve not at trifles, for like spring,
Both smiles and tears are on the wing,
And happy they whose wisdom, sense,
Look for that noble recompense
That virtues bring.

AN ELEGY
On the death of John Thomas Sutton, Esq.
only son of Lady Sutton, of Ham Common, Surrey,
who died Sept. 12th, 1835, aged 22 years.

One poet soars to the stars for light,
Another brings a rainbow to our sight,
Another sings of rivulets and bowers,
And all that's radiant among the flowers;
Some dwell on riches— others scan the truth,
And write a moral in the cause of youth.

The latter theme, impotent in its sway,
Brings forth from darkness universal day,
Gives virtue all its energy divine,
And sheds a glory round religion's shrine;
Forewarns the thoughtless of that certain doom,
Where no hope comes—the joyless, silent tomb.

Grim death, that dark destroyer, heeds not worth,
Nor loveliness, nor all the claims of birth;
Nor heeds a parent's agonizing throes,
When on her beautiful, the grave must close;
Nor heeds impassioned love, or friendship's care,
Or the deep anguish of the fondest prayer.

How smooth is song, when joy the cadence raise,
And those we love add pleasure to our days,
When the bright eye and healthy cheek attest
That all is calm and peaceful in the breast,
When racking pains bends not the graceful form,
As flowers that droop beneath the pelting storm.

But sad reverse, the muse again must weep,
And round a bier her fearful vigils keep;
A valued son, snatch'd from th' admiring crowd,
With the vast numbers that now wear a shroud;
Cheerless he lies, cold in his narrow bed,
Bathed in the withering perfumes of the dead.

The dear one's gone—what grief attends the theme,
What gloomy horrors darken life's fair dream;
The tender mother swims before our sight,
Clasping that form, once noble in its might,
Gazing, and listening if that balmy breath
Cannot defy the potent arm of death.

But ah, dismay, the fond embrace, how vain,
That gentle voice will ne'er be heard again;
The pallid features, and the dim fix'd eye,
And icy hand, in dark oblivion lie;
And wakeful thoughts of melody that wore
A filial obedience, are no more.

High talented, with ample powers to please,
Skilled in that art which sets the mind at ease;
Meek in his virtues—a beloved son,
Who died serenely when his hour was come,
A plighted glory to his soul was given,
With "radiant feet” to tread the path of heaven.

A confidence to pass that boundless shore,
And those dread horrors man could ne'er explore,
Skirted by other worlds profoundly great,
But wisely veiled from this our earthly state;
Bright spirits only can such wonders see,
Or mount the heights where dwells the Deity.

And say, ye learned, who so deeply draw
From vast illustrious sources every law,
By which creation all her parts supply,
Both things unseen, and those that meet the eye,
If those once cherished beings ever blend
Immortal glories with a mortal friend.

Ye answer not—but let a parent's woe
Be softened by the thought, it may be so;
Omnipotence, whom we are taught to trust,
That separates the essence from the dust,
That models the eternal powers at will,
Can tell the spirit to be near us still.

The sculptured urn within its darksome shrine,
Contains no particles of parts divine,
Yet the fond heart, alive to all the woes
That death has left, with mental grief o’erflows,
Clings to its love, and seeks the shadowy gloom
That clothes the precincts of an early tomb.

While keen remembrance, with its active powers,
Brings back the radiant light of happy hours,
Brings back the fond career, the smiles, the voice
Of him, who made each kindred heart rejoice;
Brings back the purity and charms of youth,
With that angelic sweetness found in truth.

How many weeping mothers watch the breath
Of loveliness, stretch'd on the bed of death,
Seeing the young life ebbing from that form,
Whether of humble birth, or nobly born,
In mute despair, too mighty and severe
For aught but dumb distraction, and a tear.

Peace to the ashes of the lovely ones,
Whose glories lie beyond revolving suns;
Whether attending in our nighty dreams,
Or, like the seraphs, wrapp'd in golden beams,
High bliss is theirs! what thrilling sense appears
In these few words, to dry a mother's tears.

She published in 1847 The Oath of Allegiance: A tale of the times of Philip the second, described as "the best historical romance that has been published in a long time. The style is terse and vigorous, but eloquent and pleasing; and the characters are drawn with graphic accuracy."

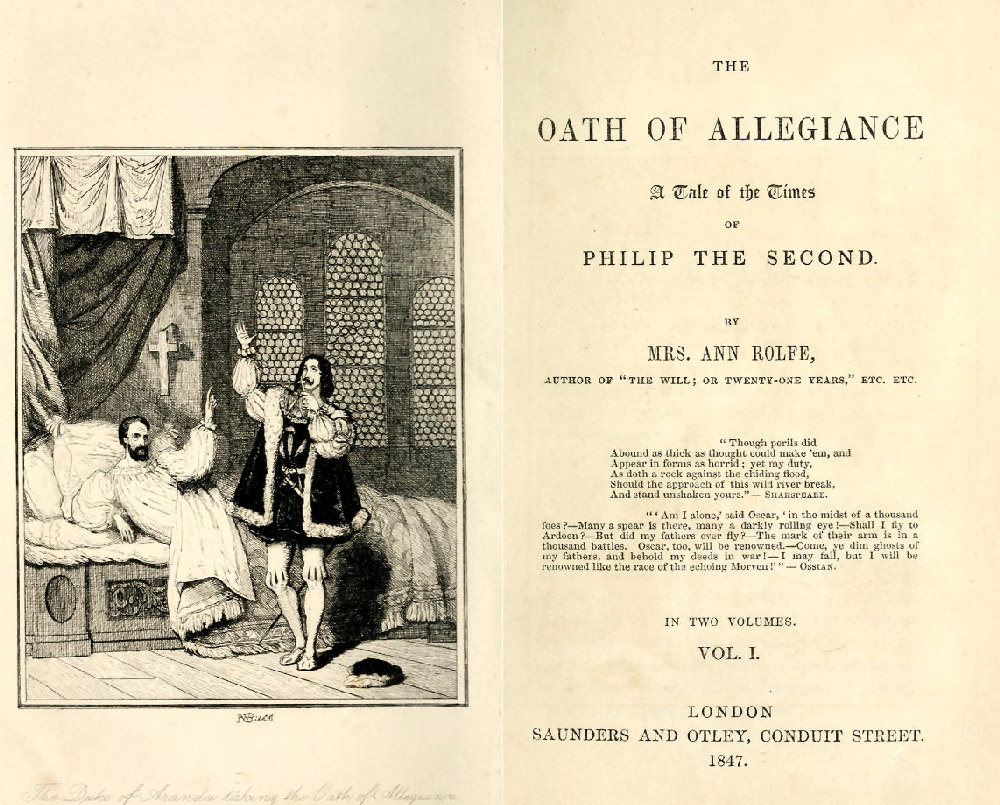

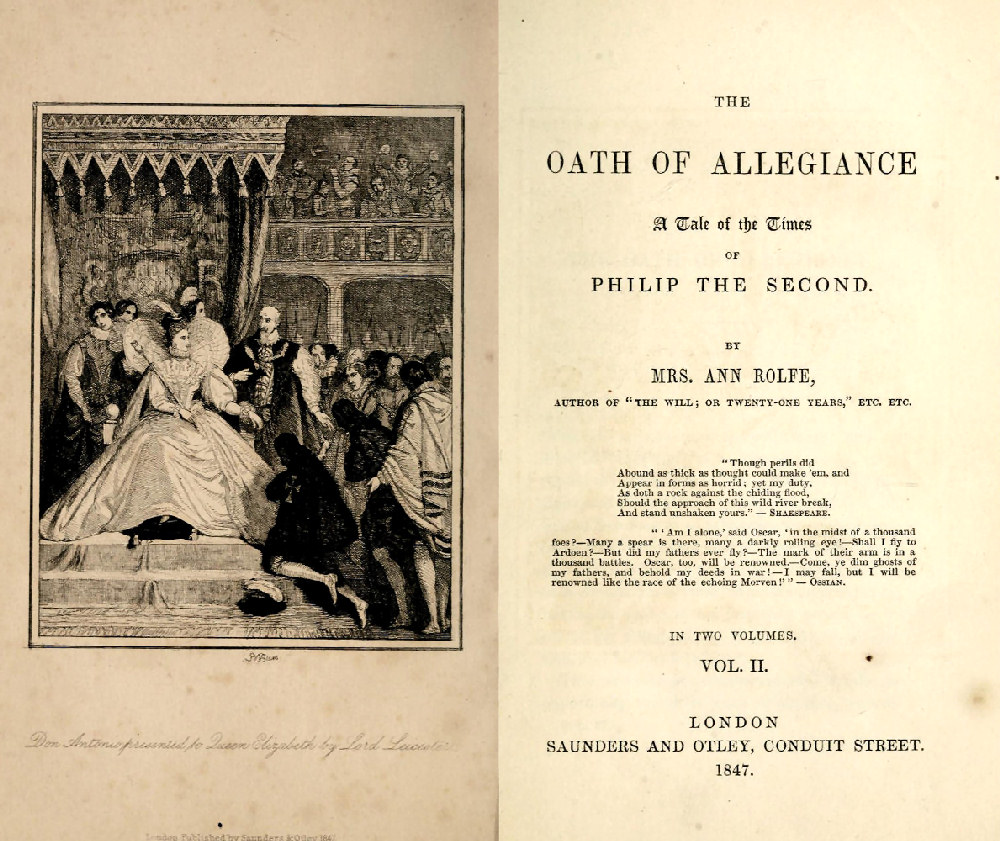

== Personal life ==
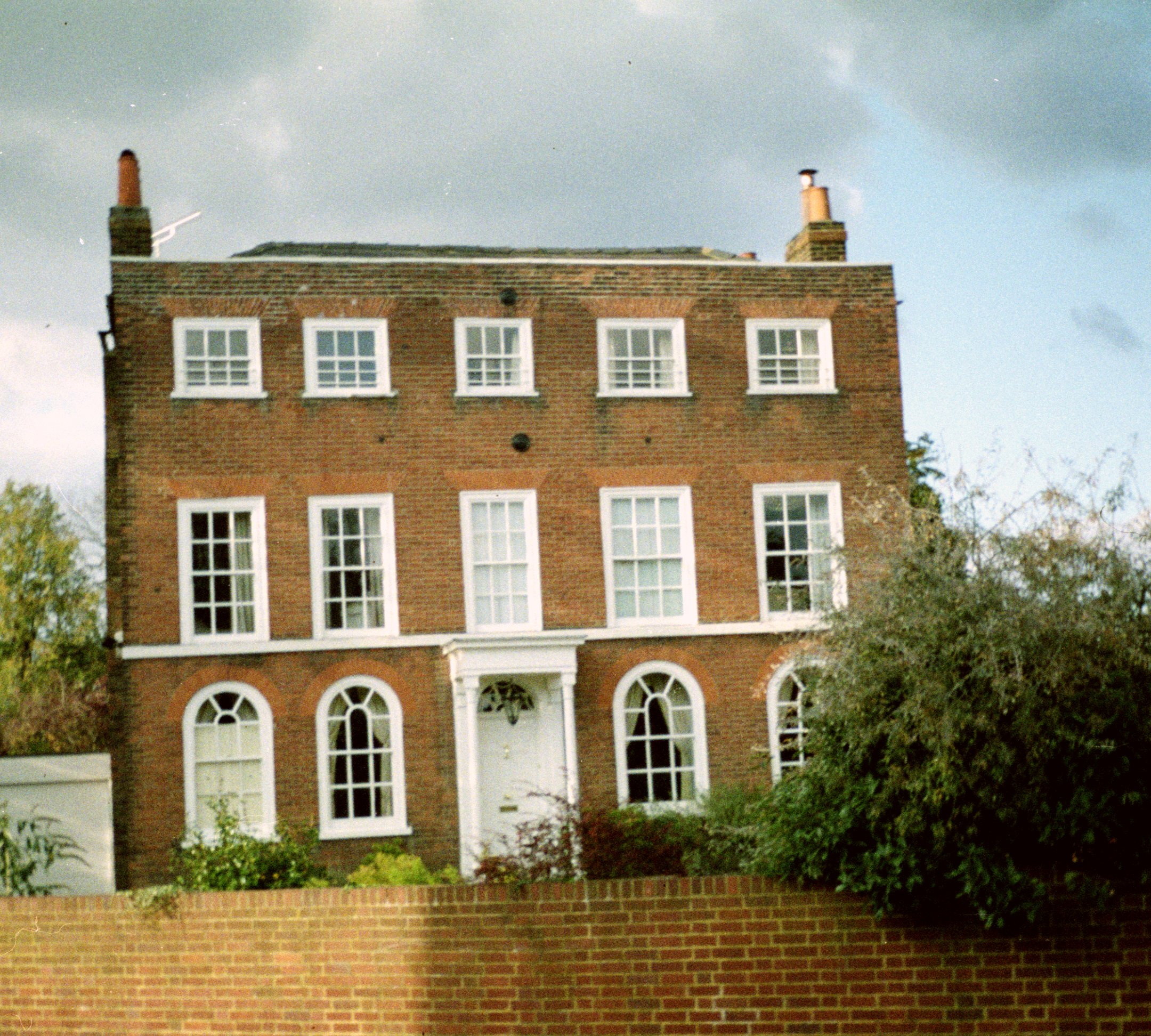
Selby House, Ham Common

She married Philip Plumb (c1737–1817), a schoolmaster and widower, in Bury St Edmunds, on 2 June 1810. He died on 30 April 1817 in Bury St Edmunds.

They had two sons.

- Montague Grosvenor Plumb, (1812–1875) was recorded as marrying in Madras, India, in 1833 to Miss Cox.

- Sydney Waller Plumb, who was born on 10 July 1813, and baptised on 28 July at St Mary's Church, Bury St Edmunds. He died 18 February 1831 in Kingston upon Thames.

She married, for a second time, Edward Rolfe (c 1789, Saxham, Suffolk) of the Cock Inn, Clare on 24 February 1818 in St Mary's Church, Bury St Edmunds. She gives her address as Selby House, Ham Common, from 1835. In 1841 they were running the Ham Street School with both boys and girls as pupils.

She died on 4 August 1850 at Selby House and was buried at All Saints Church, Kingston upon Thames, on 12 August. The obituary records that "she left a husband and son with numerous friends and pupils to lament her loss."

In 1851 Edward was still running a girls' school at Selby House with 11 pupils, one teacher and a servant.

== Books ==
1824. Miscellaneous Poems for a Winter's Evening, Colchester: J Chaplin

1825. Choice and No Choice, or the First of May. London: T H Cock. 2 vol.

1828. The Will; or, Twenty-one Years, 1 vol. Saxmundham (Printed and sold by L Brightly)

1847. The Oath of Allegiance: A Tale of the Times of Philip the Second. 2 vol. London: Saunders and Otley
