= Gordon House, Ham =

Building in London, England

Coordinates: 51°26′05″N 0°18′37″W

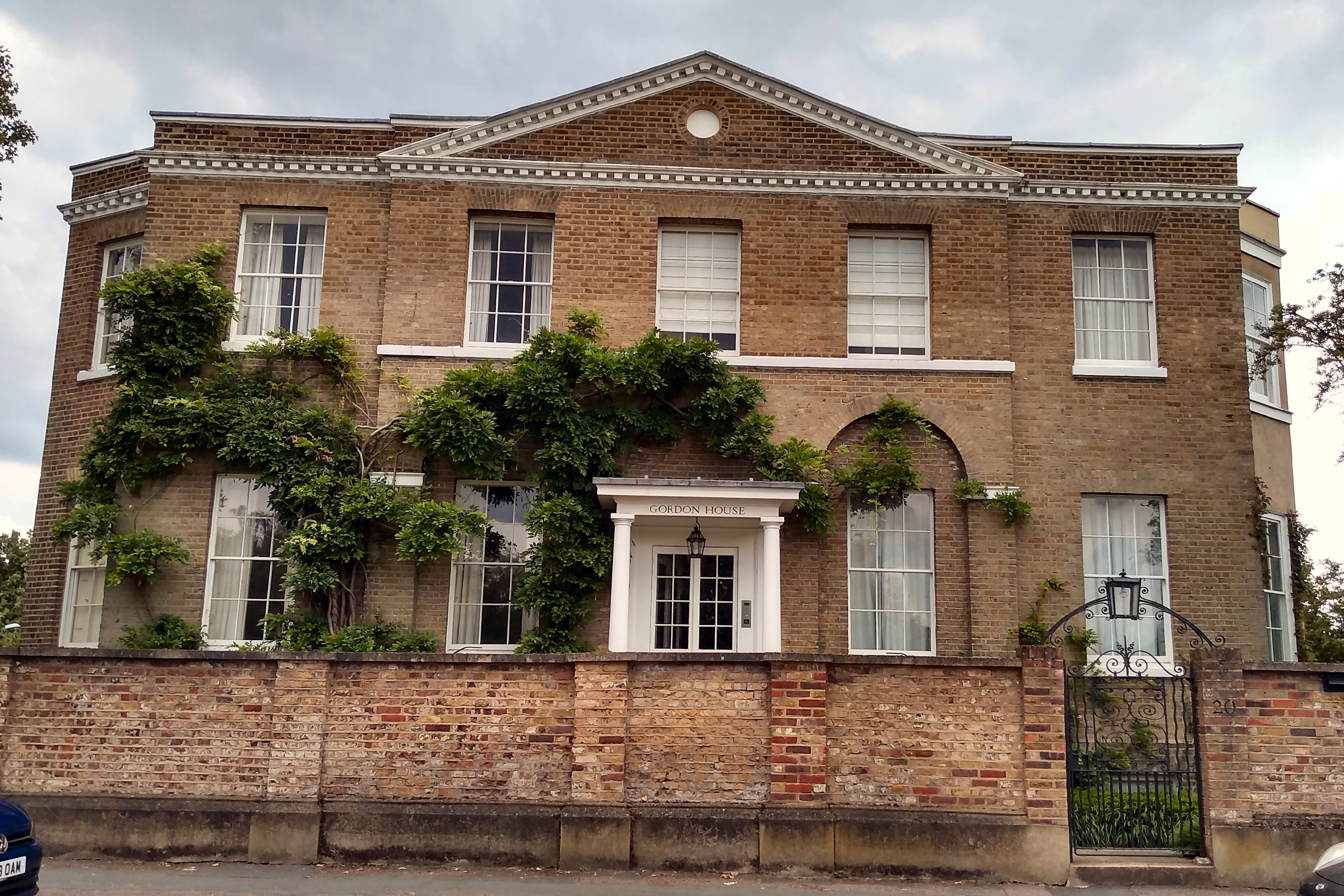
Gordon House

Gordon House is a Grade II-listed house facing Ham Common in the London Borough of Richmond upon Thames. It dates back to the reign of Charles II. The classical front was added in the Georgian period together with other extensions.

== Description ==
Gordon House is a two-storey house, built in grey brick, with five bay windows and a porch with Tuscan columns. A coach house and stables were added in 1872.

== History ==
Gordon House was the home of Gordon Forbes (1738–1828), a senior officer in the British Army. Gordon Forbes lived here with his family from 1783. He was an army officer, a Major, later Colonel (1790) and General (1812). He had previously lived in Richmond. His two eldest sons were killed in battle but his third son, also named Gordon, later returned to live in Forbes House. His daughter Maria Margaret married James Collyer Dawkins, living in Petersham and later Sudbrook Lodge.

The house was a boys' school from 1841 to 1845, run by William May. Later occupants were Henry Cremer, a merchant (1851), and Joseph Clarke, a surgeon (1861). After that the house was occupied by short-term tenants.

Other residents included J H Sharpe, a solicitor (1870s), Rev W Popham (1880s), Slingsby Duncombe Shafto (about 1884), Archibald Fowler, a solicitor, (1900–1912), Major Milner (1914–1918), Carlos Bovill (1920s), and Mrs Oldham Foster, who died here in 1923. Fanny Allen Browning, widow of Colonel Montague Charles Browning, who died here on 10 July 1929, was mother to Frederick Browning and Admiral Sir Montague Edward Browning. She was followed by Major Harry Baines, and by Major Alan Bott (from 1929 to 1952).

In 1952 the Dowager Marchioness Linlithgow lived here and created a fine garden. She died in a car crash on her way to open the outpatients department at Kingston Hospital in 1965. After her death half the garden was sold to create Mornington Walk.
