= Orford Hall, Ham Common =

Building in London, England

Coordinates: 51°26′11″N 0°18′26″W

Orford Hall is a Grade II-listed house facing Ham Common in the London Borough of Richmond upon Thames.

== Description ==
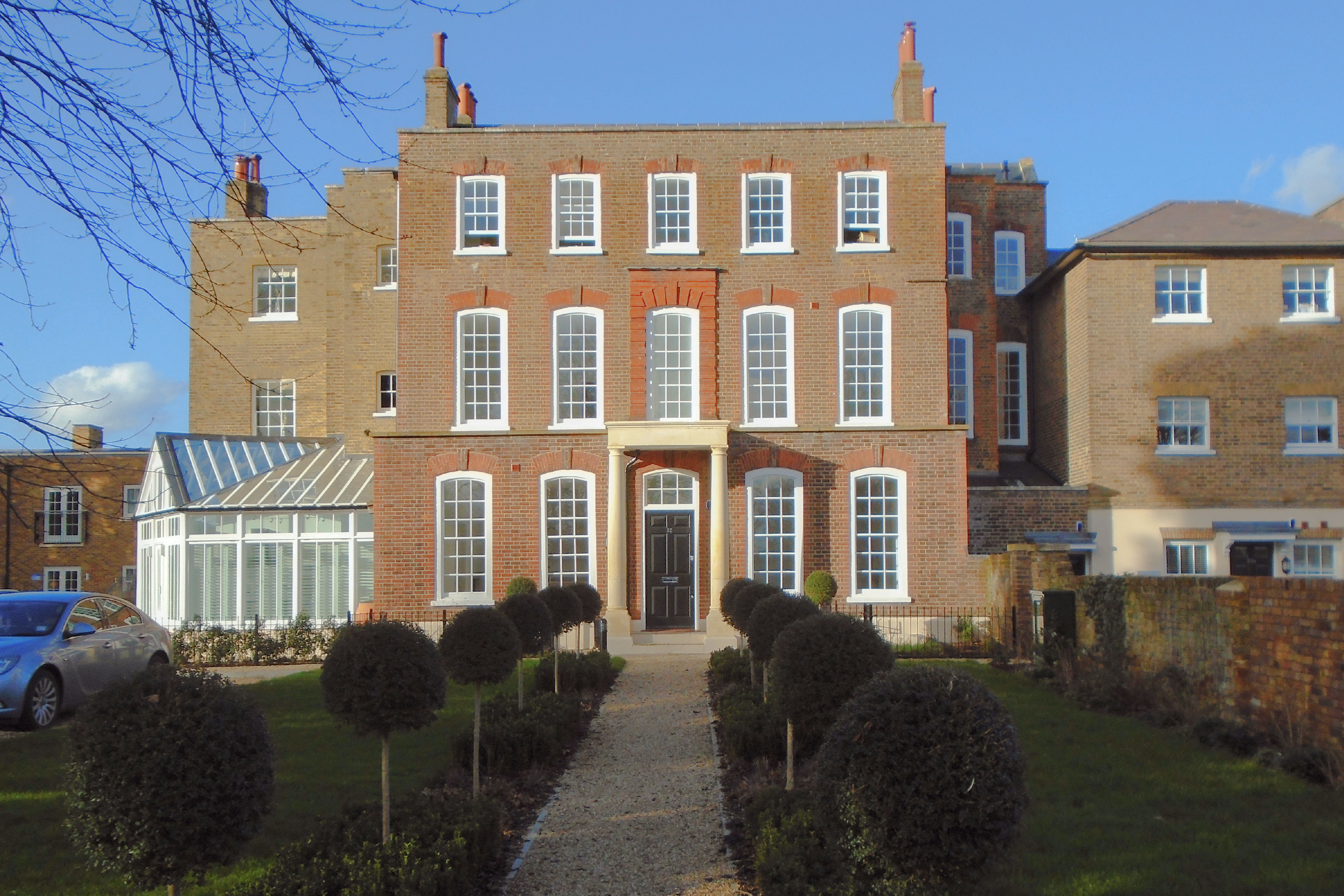
Orford House

Orford House was built 1730–1734, of three-storeys with five windows. A glass entrance with a porch was added to the south west side in 1893–1894, a small eastern extension was added in 1911 and another extension on the north-west side in 1933. Finally, two large wings and the chapel were added in 1956 to the east and west. These wings and chapel were demolished when the site was converted to flats.

== History ==
Orford House has been home to many notable residents.

It was home of William Golightly from 1786 to his death in 1812. It was then occupied by Admiral Sir John Sutton, KCB (c. 1758–1825) who was a Royal Navy officer, captain of HMS Egmont during the French Revolutionary Wars. His wife died here in 1836. Francis Love Beckford (1789–1875), merchant, landholder and slave owner, died here in April 1875. His daughter lived here until 1906.

Frances Margaret Hornby (1843–1924), youngest sister of Emily Hornby, lived here from 1909 until her death in 1924. She possibly painted the Egyptian artwork in the summer house which were discovered in 1936.

The house was sold in 1925 to Colonel Arthur Spencer Pratt and he changed the name to Orford Hall. He died here in 1933 and his funeral was held at St Andrew's Church, Ham. In the 1930s his wife would hold garden parties here. Sir Weldon Dalrymple-Champneys, 2nd Baronet (1892–1980), a British physician who was a leading figure in the public health service, lived here in the 1940s.

In 1945, the house was owned for a year by Lilian Maud Glen, the elder daughter of George Coats, 1st Baron Glentanar and wife of Arthur Wellesley, 5th Duke of Wellington. She died on 3 May 1946 at Orford Hall. It then became a school.

In 1949 it was sold to the Anglican Community of the Sisters of the Church who renamed it St Michael's Convent. When they left in 2016 the chapel was demolished and the site was converted by Beechcroft into flats with 14 new homes and renamed Orford Place. The communal walled gardens include a 300-year old mulberry (Morus nigra).
