= Carlos Bovill =

English officer in the Royal Flying Corps

Lieutenant-Colonel Carlos Bovill OBE (1882 – 1938) was an officer in the Royal Garrison Artillery (RGA) who was attached to the Royal Flying Corps (RFC) in World War I in the No. 1 Kite Balloon Squadron.

== Early life ==
Bovill was born in Godalming on 21 October 1882, the eldest son of Alfred Bovill, a corn merchant, and his wife Jessie Amelia Clarke. His parents divorced in 1897; in 1898 Jessie was remarried to the Hon. Richard Cecil Grosvenor, youngest son of Richard Grosvenor, 1st Baron Ebury. Bovill was educated at St. David's school, Reigate, and Eton College (1896-1901). He served in the Eton Volunteers as a sergeant in the 4th Volunteer or Territorial Battalion, Oxfordshire Light Infantry.

== Career ==
In 1900 he was commissioned as a second lieutenant in the Lancashire Royal Garrison Artillery Militia. He was then posted to Gibraltar and India (until 1911), when he returned to England.

In 1914 he was promoted to captain in the Royal Garrison Artillery where he was an artillery observer in No. 6 Squadron Royal Flying Corps. In 1915 he qualified as an observer. He was a general staff officer in the RGA between April 1915 to October 1916. During the Battle of the Somme in 1916 he commanded No. 1 Kite Balloon Squadron. He was promoted to major in the RFC and as temporary Lieutenant-Colonel in September 1916.

In September 1916 he went to the Kite Balloon Training School, which was based at the Royal Naval Air Service (RNAS) in Roehampton, to obtain his Balloon Officer qualification. At the end of 1916 until 1918 he was based in Egypt, finally commanded the 6th Balloon Wing in the Middle East. He obtained his pilot wings in October 1918 with the No 5 Fighting School at Heliopolis.

At the end of the war, he returned to the Royal Garrison Artillery as lieutenant-colonel and left the army in January 1920.

He was appointed OBE 'In recognition of distinguished services rendered during the War' in the 1919 Birthday Honours (OBE). He was made an Officer of the Ordre de St. Saveur (Order of the Redeemer) by Alexander of Greece.

== Personal life ==
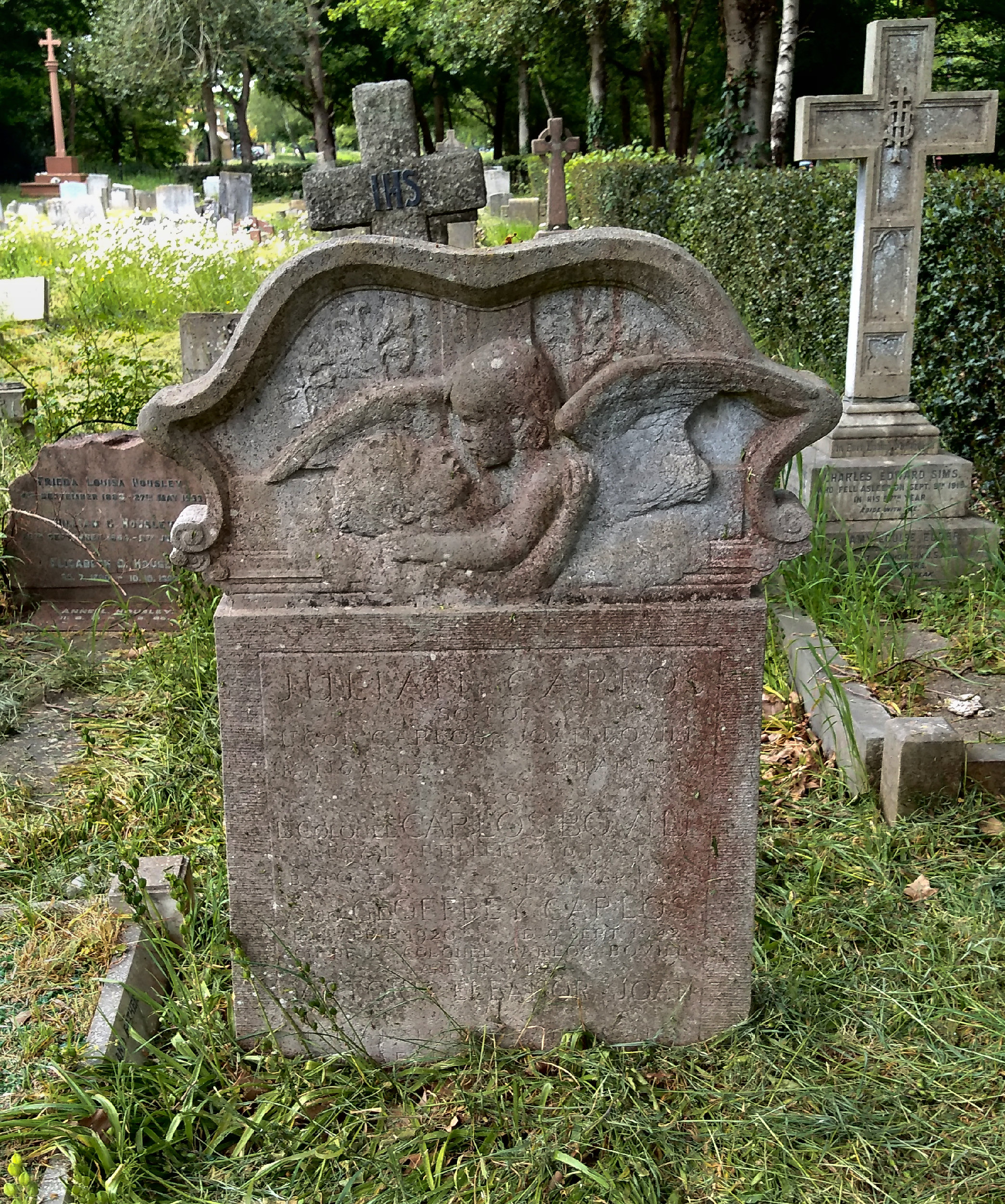
St Andrew's Church, Ham

He married Victoria Eleanor Joan Ley (1880-1957) on 22 April 1909 at St Mary Abbots, Kensington. He died on 20 March 1938 in Chelsea, London. His funeral was held at Golders Green Crematorium. He is commemorated at St Andrew's Church, Ham, on the headstone for his eldest son, Julian (1912–1919), along with his second son, Geoffrey Carlos (1920–1942), and his wife. The family had lived at Gordon House on Ham Common, London, after the war.
