= Selby House, Ham =

Building in London, England

Coordinates: 51°26′11″N 0°18′39″W

Selby House is a Grade II-listed house facing Ham Common in the London Borough of Richmond upon Thames.

== Description ==
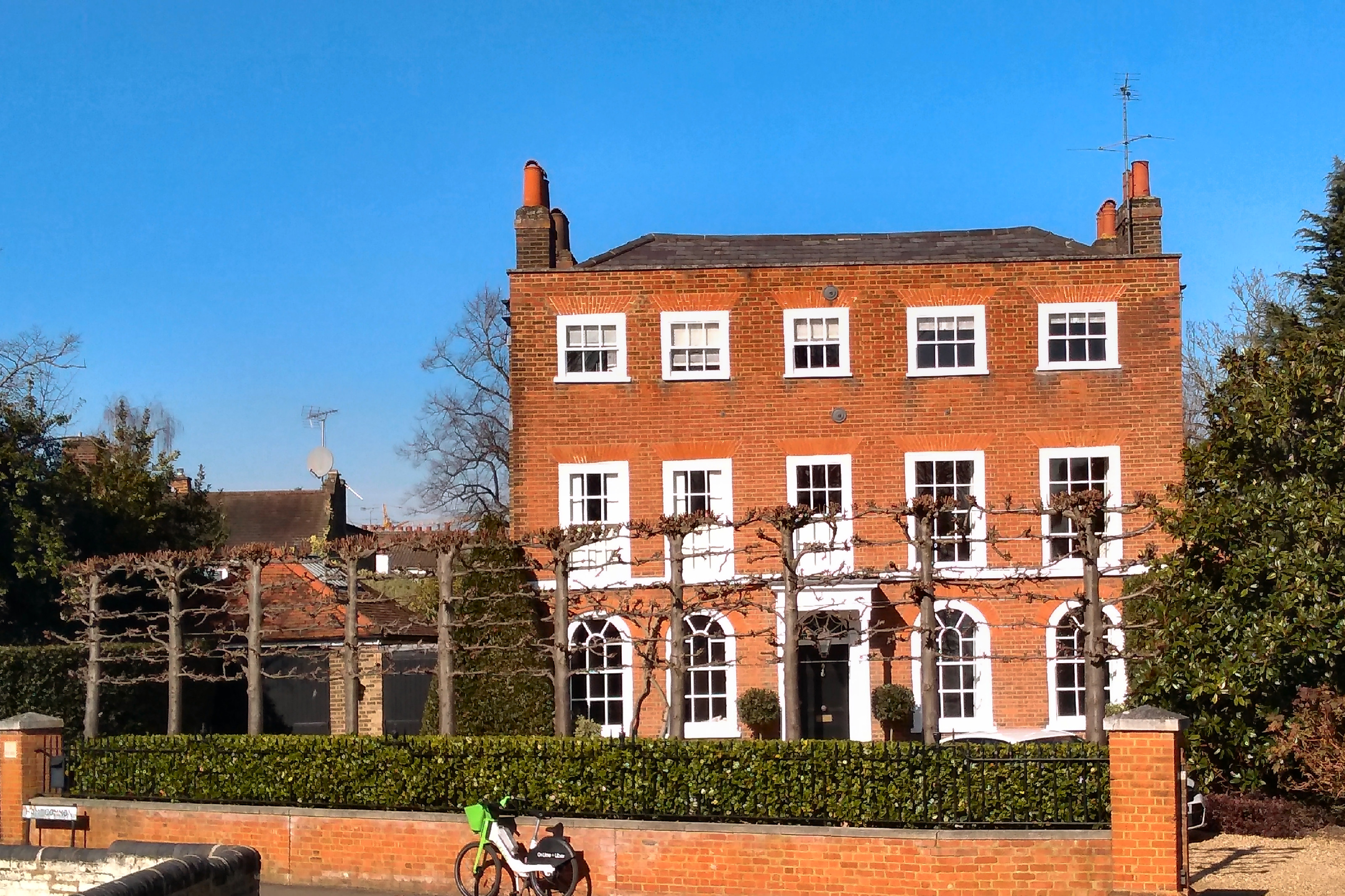
Selby House

Selby House is a three-storey brick house with five windows. Built in 1683, it was modified in the early 18th century. In the 19th century it was refaced and a porch was added.

== History ==
Selby House dates from the 17th century when in the 1649 Survey of Ham Manor the land was called Three Elm Square Piece. A farmhouse known as Brimsweech Close stood here in 1695 and was replaced or enlarged in the early 18th century as Selby House.

There is a story that George III’s wife, Charlotte, visited in 1809 but that is more likely to have been Newman House in Ham.

It was the home of the writer and poet Ann Rolfe (1789–1850) from about 1835 to her death in 1850. She operated a seminary for girls and her husband Edward was schoolmaster at the National School.

Frederick Benbow, a perfumer, second son of George Henry Benbow, died here in 1859.

Miss Copeland advertised her services in teaching French, German and drawing about 1870. It was then the home of Charles Edward Withall and his family until the late 1880s.

The Noble family lived in Selby House from 1889 to 1953. Archibald Francis Noble (1886–1916) was a captain in the 10th Cheshire Regiment who was killed in World War I fighting in France. There is a memorial to him in St Andrew's Church, Ham. Elizabeth Mary Noble had married Kenneth Douglas Field (1880–1917) from Latchmere House; he was killed in 1917. They are both commemorated on Ham's War Memorial. Her son-in-law, RAF pilot Arthur David Watson, was killed in 1940 in World War II and is commemorated on Petersham's War Memorial.
