= Ham Common, London =

Common land in London

Ham Common
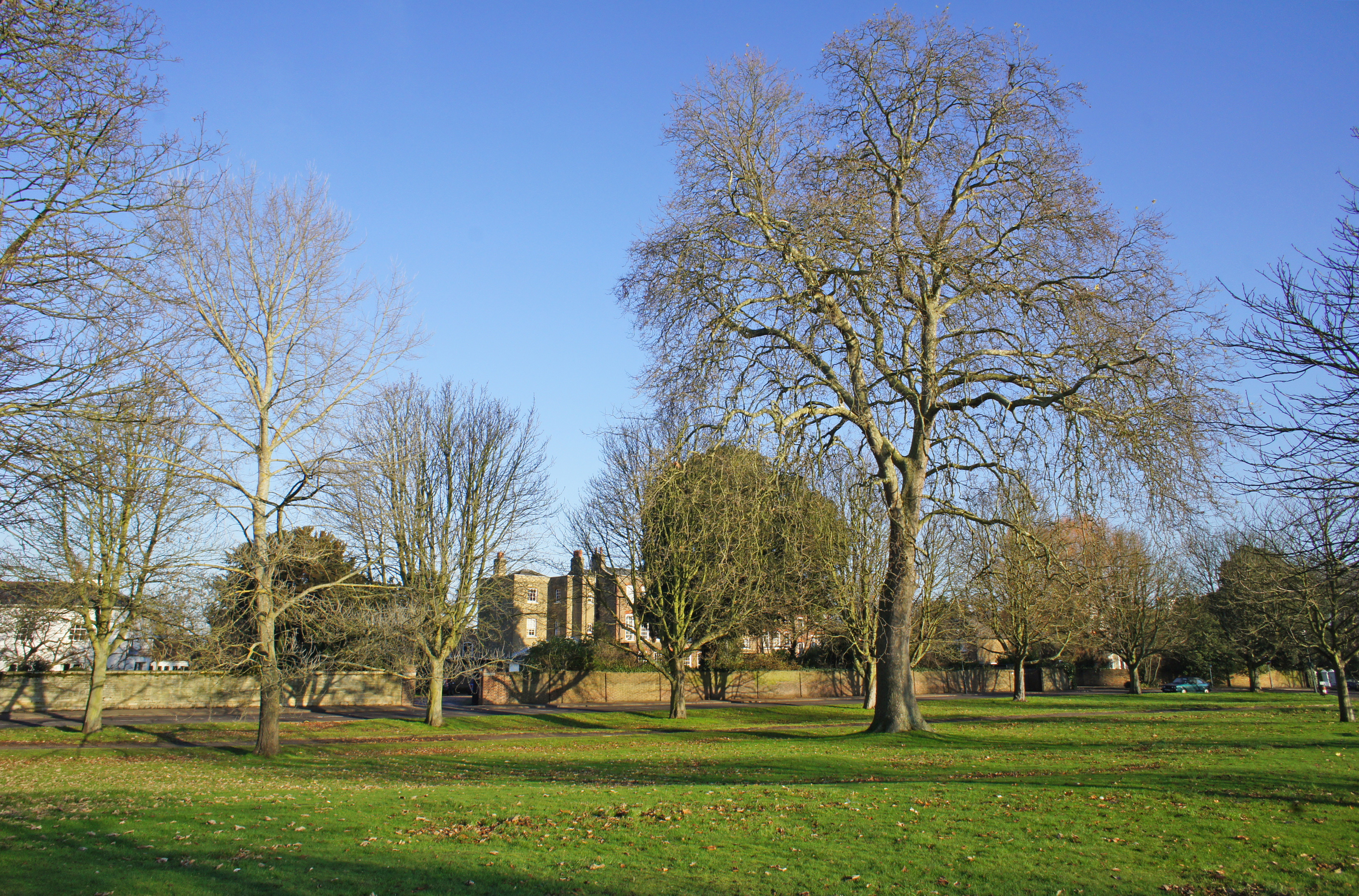
- Interactive map of Ham Common
- Type: Common land
- Location: Ham, London
- Coordinates: 51.435°N 0.306°W
- Area: 48.69 hectares (120.3 acres)
- Operator: London Borough of Richmond upon Thames
- Open: All year
- Status: Conservation area

Ham Common is an area of common land in Ham, Greater London. It is a conservation area in, and managed by, the London Borough of Richmond upon Thames. It comprises 48.69 hectares (120.3 acres), the second largest area of common land in the borough, 2 acres (0.81 ha) smaller than Barnes Common. It is divided into two distinct habitats, grassland and woodland, separated by the A307, Upper Ham Road. It is an area of ecological, historical and recreational interest, designated a Local Nature Reserve.

== Description ==
To the west of the Upper Ham Road lies a triangular green of approximately 20 acres (8.1 ha), bounded by mature trees and crossed by an avenue that forms part of the southern approach to Ham House. There is a village pond near the western corner which attracts water fowl and other wildlife in the western section.

=== Ham Common Woods ===
On the eastern side of Upper Ham Road (A307) lies a larger wooded area, Ham Common Woods, that extends for 1 kilometre (0.62 miles) to Richmond Park in the east and Sudbrook Park, Petersham to the north. The B352 road, Ham Gate Avenue, crosses this area, linking the A307 to Richmond Park at Ham Gate. The Latchmere Stream, now culverted for most of its course, has its outfall in a pond near Ham Gate in Ham Common Woods. Two cedar trees were planted to mark King George V's coronation in 1911.

Since the cessation of grazing in the 1930s, the eastern section has transitioned from acid grassland heath with gorse, bracken and bramble, to mixed oak woodland. Pioneer birch, now dying back, is giving way to holly, yew and oak. The thick under-storey of this habitat contrasts with the open, deer-grazed woodland in adjacent Richmond Park to the east and the mown grasslands of the western section and Richmond Golf Club in Sudbrook Park to the north. The local authority and volunteer groups manage the habitat, keeping paths and bridleways clear and removing invasive species such as Snowberry. The remaining open area of sandy, acid grassland has a noted colony of the Ashy mining bee and other solitary bees.

Parts of Church Road, Ham Common are closed to traffic in spring to protect migrating toads to cross safely. New ponds were constructed in early 2017 by Froglife and Richmond Council to provide a habitat for the Common Toad.

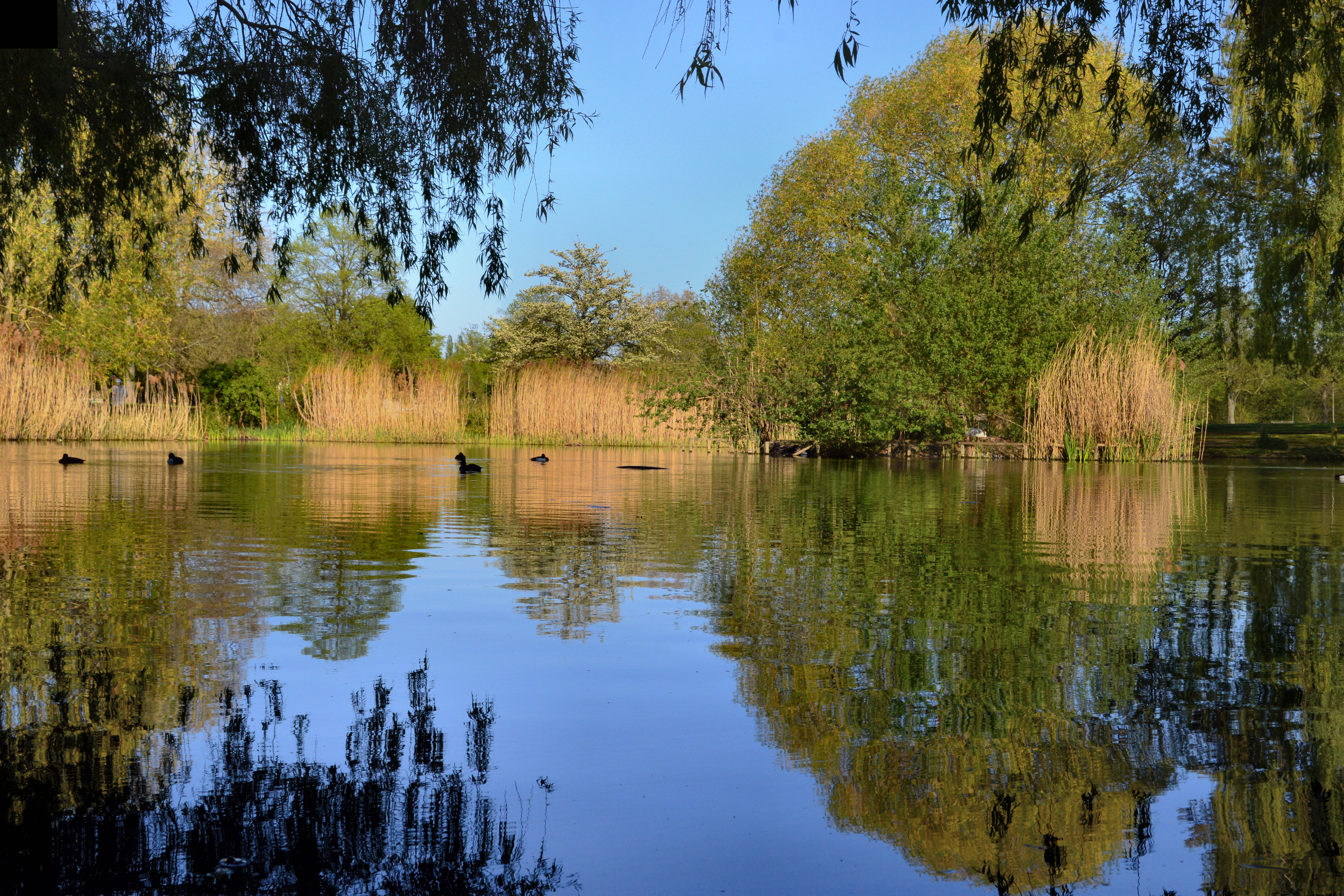
The pond on Ham Common

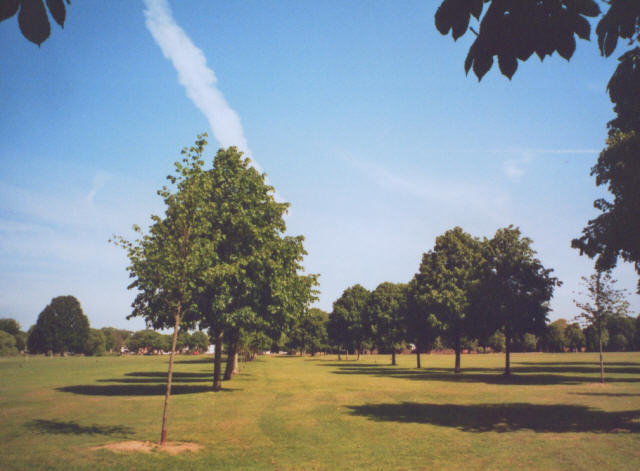
An avenue of lime trees leads towards Ham House

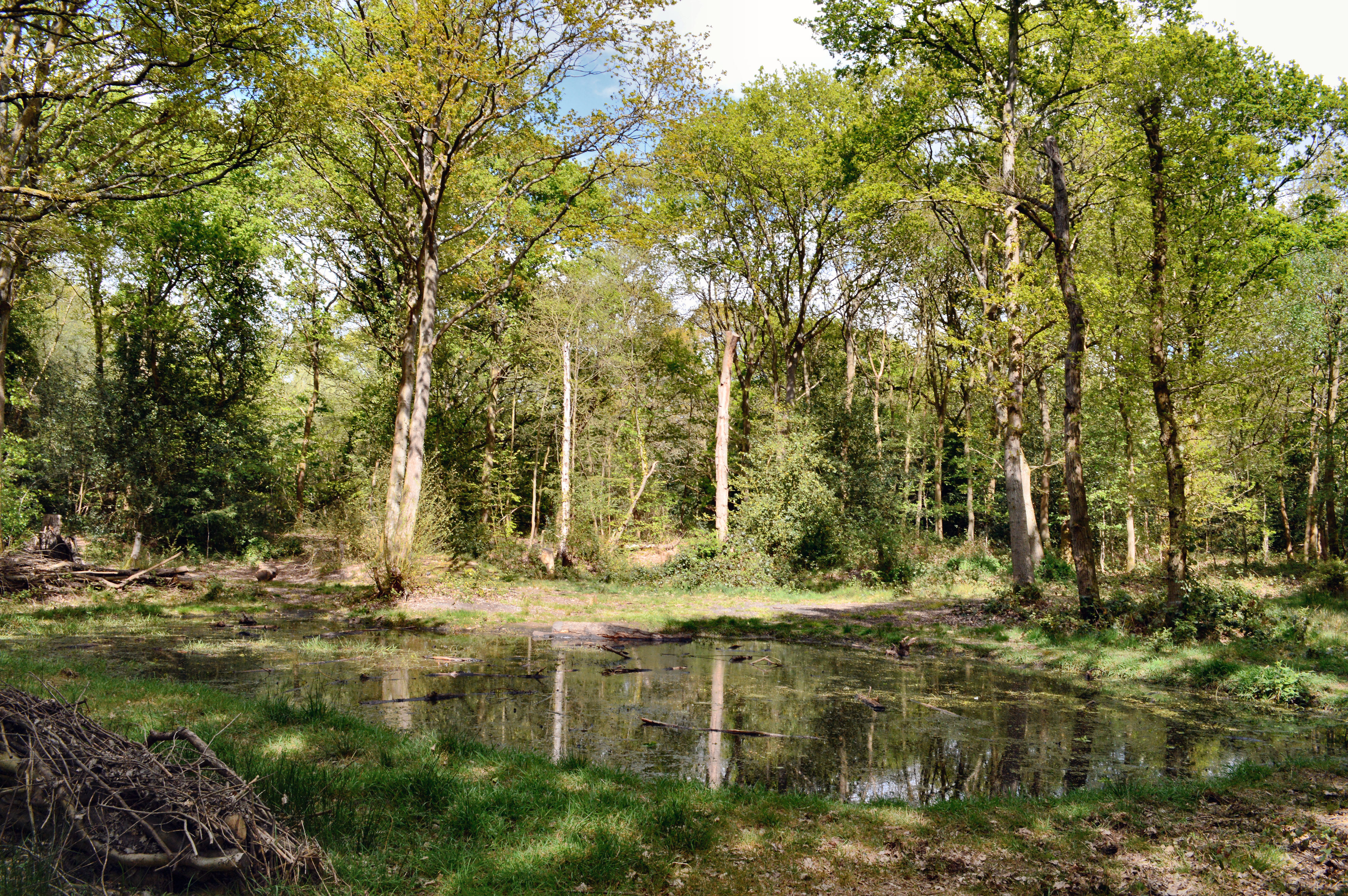
The ponds in Ham Common Woods

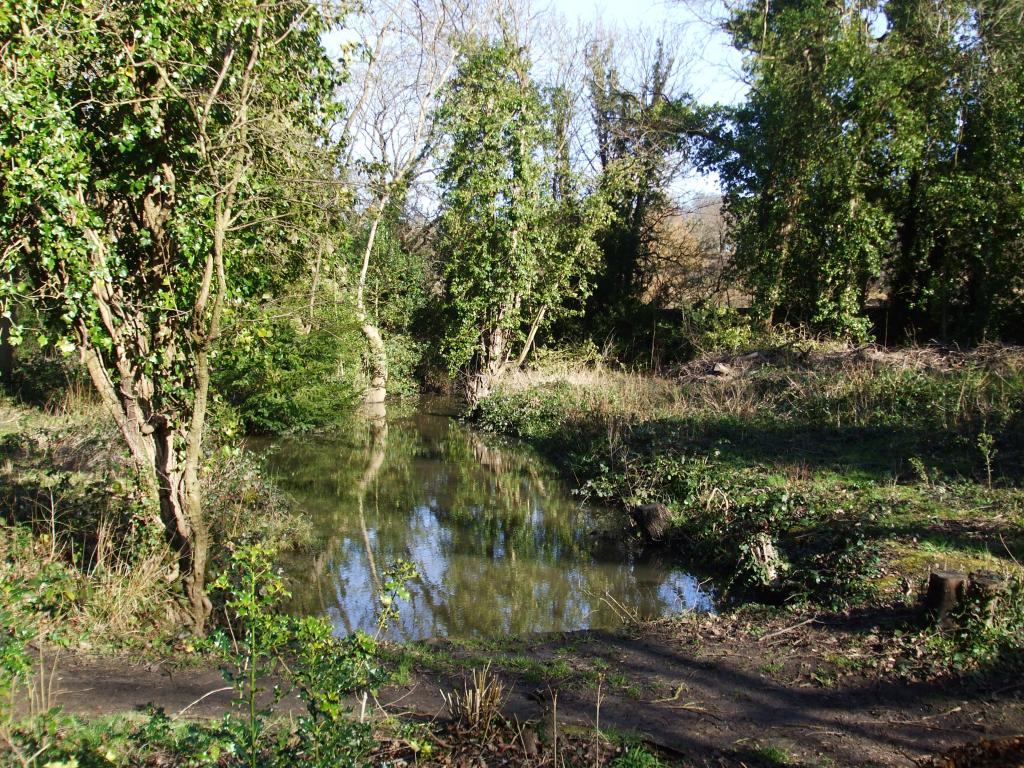
Latchmere Stream

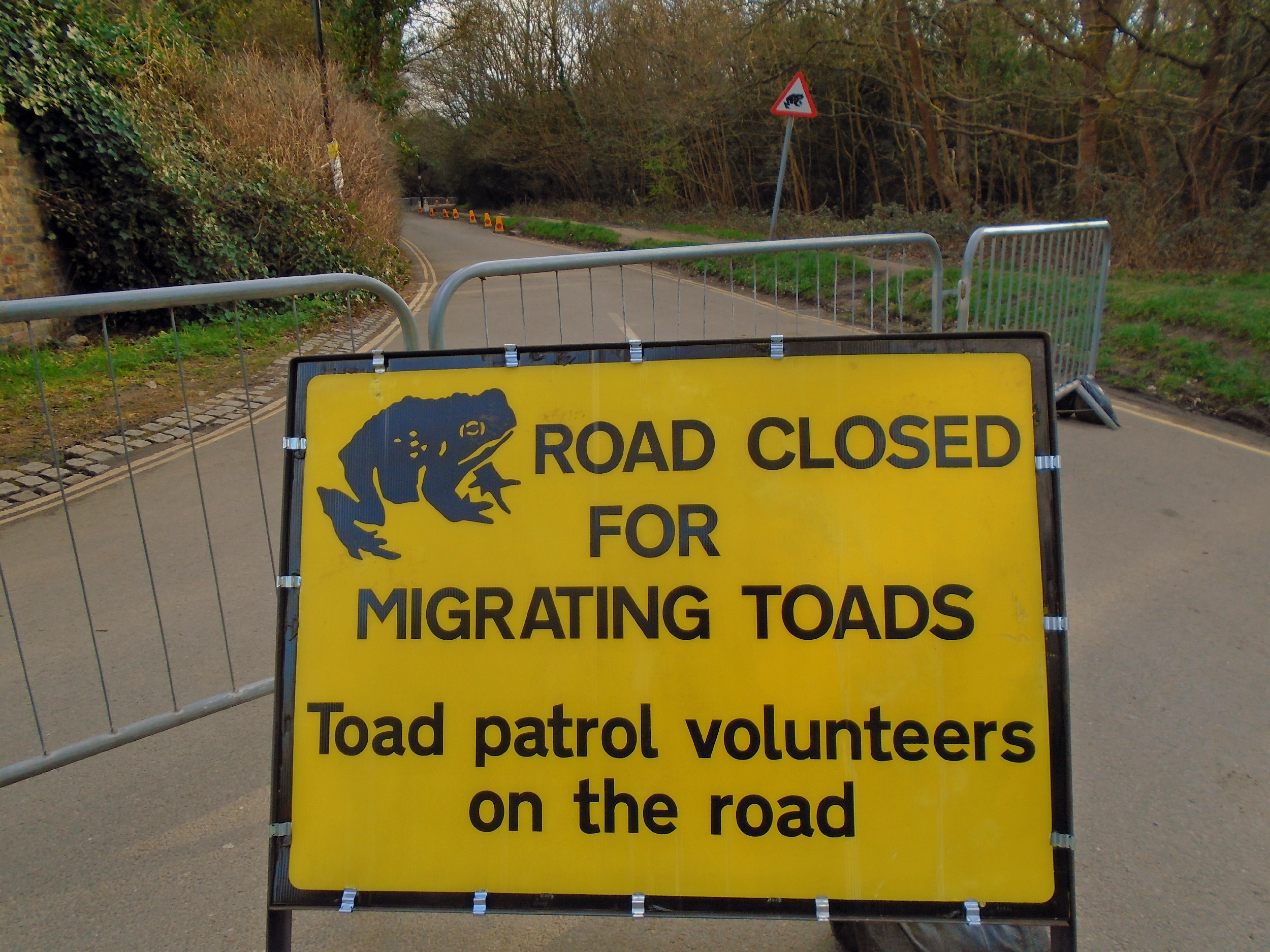
Church Road closed to protect migrating toads

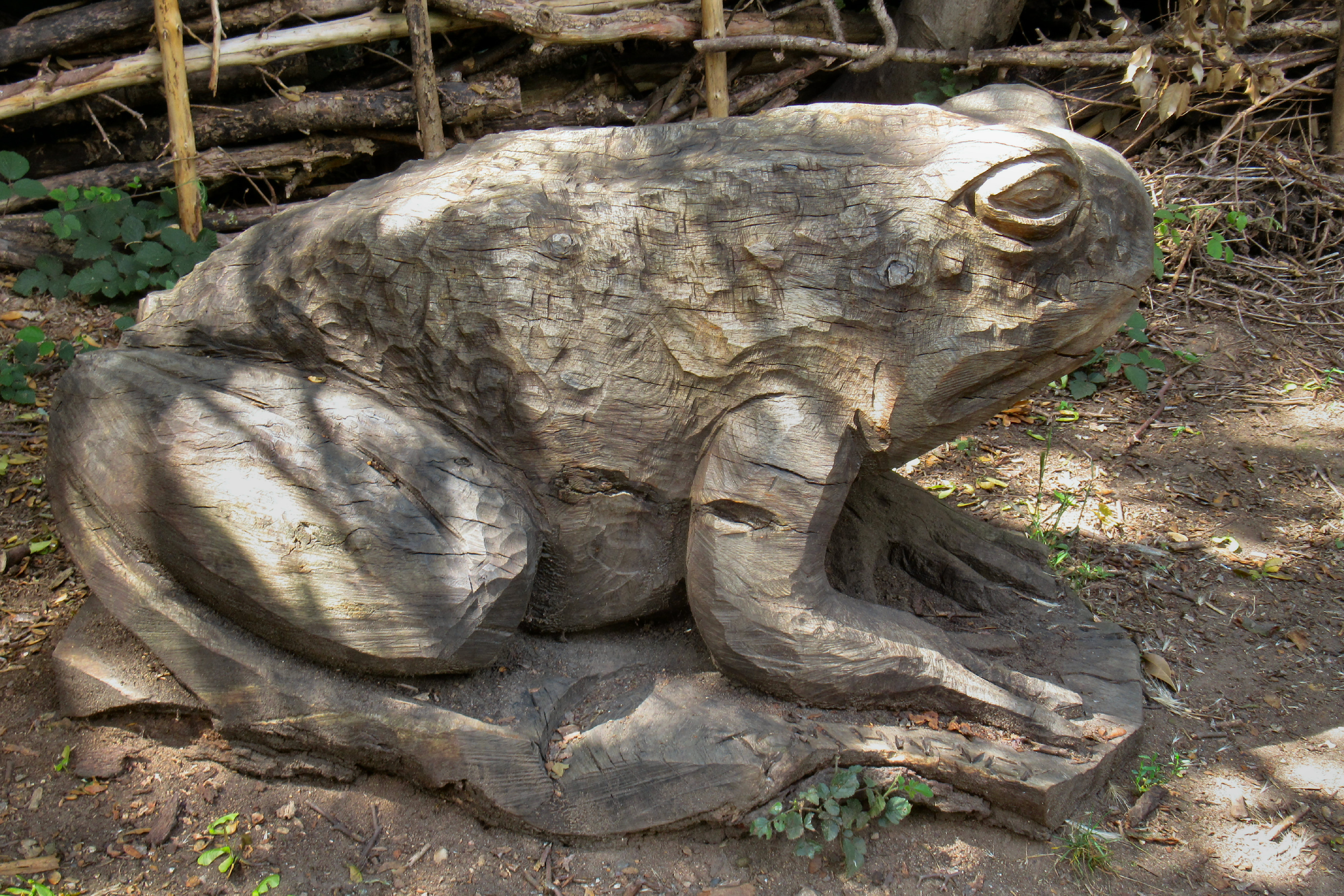
Toad wood carving by Tom Harvey

== History ==
The map drawn up for Charles I by Nicholas Lane prior to the enclosure of Richmond Park in 1637 shows that the common land of Ham extended from its current area eastwards as far as Beverley Plains and Beverley Brook and the boundary with Roehampton. The northern part of Ham Common in this area was continuous with Petersham Common, which, in turn linked to the smaller Richmond and Mortlake commons. Of the total 1,000 acres (400 ha) enclosed by the park, 895 acres (362 ha) fell within Ham's boundaries and, of that, 400 acres (160 ha) was common land, the rest being agricultural land in private ownership or already owned by the crown. Charles I paid compensation to the commoners of Ham for their loss and granted them a deed of gift of the remaining unenclosed common land for all time. The enclosure of the Park was one of several of Charles' unpopular acts that contributed to the unrest leading to the Civil War. About ten years later, Cromwell's Army camped on Ham Common on 18 November 1647, after the Putney Debates.

Apart from area of the present day Common, other common land existed around the enclosed farm land of Ham. Commoners also enjoyed lammas rights on large areas of enclosed farmland adjoining the river.

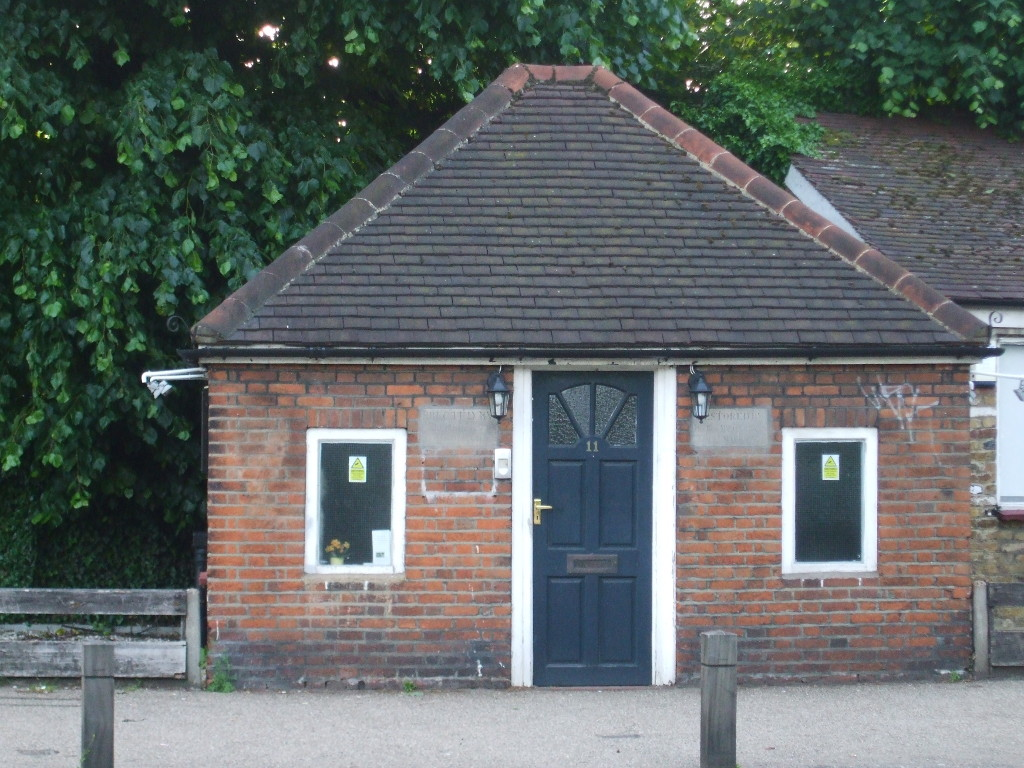
Gate House (1771) to the south of Ham Common. The gates were to prevent animals straying, not tolls.

Ownership of the common land lay with the lord of the Manor and, from the mid-17th century to the early 20th century, this was held by the Earl of Dysart and the Tollemache family. The management of Ham Common, as with most commons, moved from the manorial courts to a locally appointed vestry. The vestry records reveal typical recurring issues such as encroachment from adjacent land-owners, squatters (who might subsequently gain right of residence and add to the burden on the parish), itinerant groups, over-grazing, nuisance of geese, pigs rooting and blocking drains, turf damage from exercising horses and grazing of animals by non-local owners including, on one occasion, a flock of 200 sheep from Kingston! The common was protected by gates to prevent animals straying off. Gate houses were located near each corner of the western section of common, one on Ham Street by what is now St Thomas Aquinas Church, Ham, and two on the Upper Ham Road, to the north by the New Inn and one to the south of the common. The latter still stands, 'erected by the inhabitants of Ham and Hatch, 1771' as an almshouse, 'restored by the Hon. Mrs Algernon Tollemache, 1892', and again in 1968.

=== The defence of Ham Common ===
By the late Victorian period the increasing pressures for development on Ham Common caused by the rapid expansion of building in and around London were typical of those facing commons across the metropolis. The Metropolitan Commons Acts 1866 to 1878 were passed to help preserve them.

Lord Dysart and the Dysart Trustees sought to exploit the agricultural land of Ham and in particular the lammas land. In 1891 the Dysarts erected notices on the common warning that those removing "gravel, turf, etc without having obtained the license of the Lords of the Manor" would be liable for prosecution. They also erected notices on the lammas lands, affirming that 'trespassers will be prosecuted with the utmost rigour of the law'.

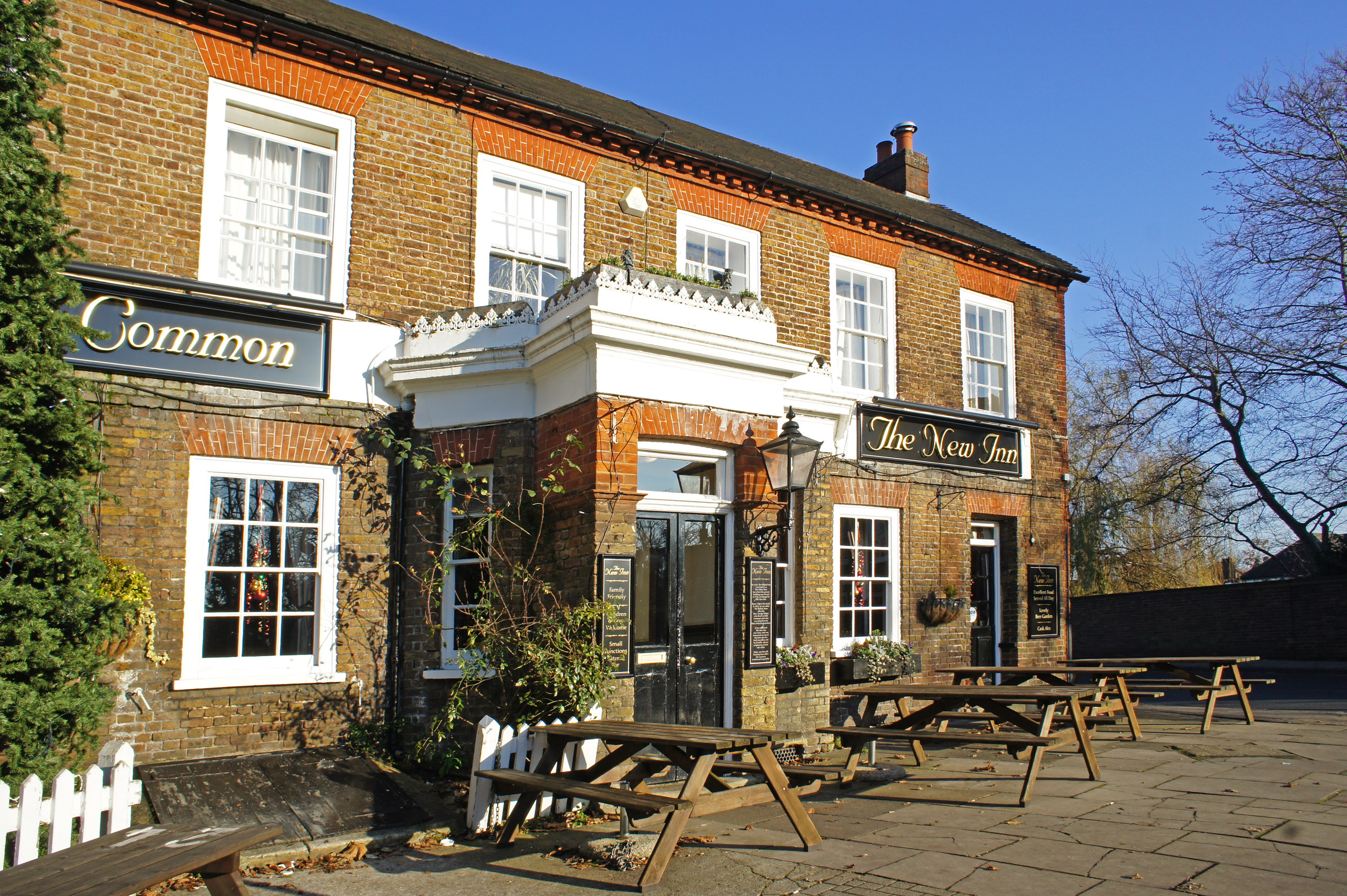
The New Inn, Ham Common

The villagers of Ham contested these actions, claiming that the Dysarts removal of gravel from the common for use at Ham House was outside the manorial right, as Ham House itself lay within the manor of Petersham. The boards also sought to restrict the rights of the commoners and four men were arrested having sawn down four of the six offending boards. Their defence was led by William Harry Harland, a journalist with the Surrey Comet, and the men were acquitted, despite the prosecution being led by no less than the Solicitor General, Sir Edward Clarke QC.

In 1896 the Dysarts promoted the Petersham and Ham Lands Footpaths Bill seeking to enclose the 176 acres (71 ha) of lammas lands. The bill was defeated by 262 votes to 118 as it was deemed to contravene the Metropolitan Commons Acts.

In December 1896, a local enquiry was established with the Board of Agriculture to consider a scheme for the lammas lands under the Metropolitan Commons Acts. The Board determined that the provisions of the acts did not apply in this case.

Metropolitan Commons (Ham) Supplemental Act 1901
- Act of Parliament
- Parliament of the United Kingdom
- Long title: An Act to confirm a Scheme relating to Ham Common in the parish of Ham in the county of Surrey.
- Citation: 1 Edw. 7. c. xxxiii

Dates
- Royal assent: 2 July 1901

Text of statute as originally enacted

The Metropolitan Commons (Ham) Supplemental Act 1901 (1 Edw. 7. c. xxxiii) established a Board of Conservators to manage Ham Common.

=== Public ownership ===
A few years later, a private bill, the Richmond Hill (Preservation of View) Bill, passed through the committee stage. The latter bill contained the same proposals but more concessions than its predecessor and focused more on the preservation of the view from Richmond Hill from urban development.

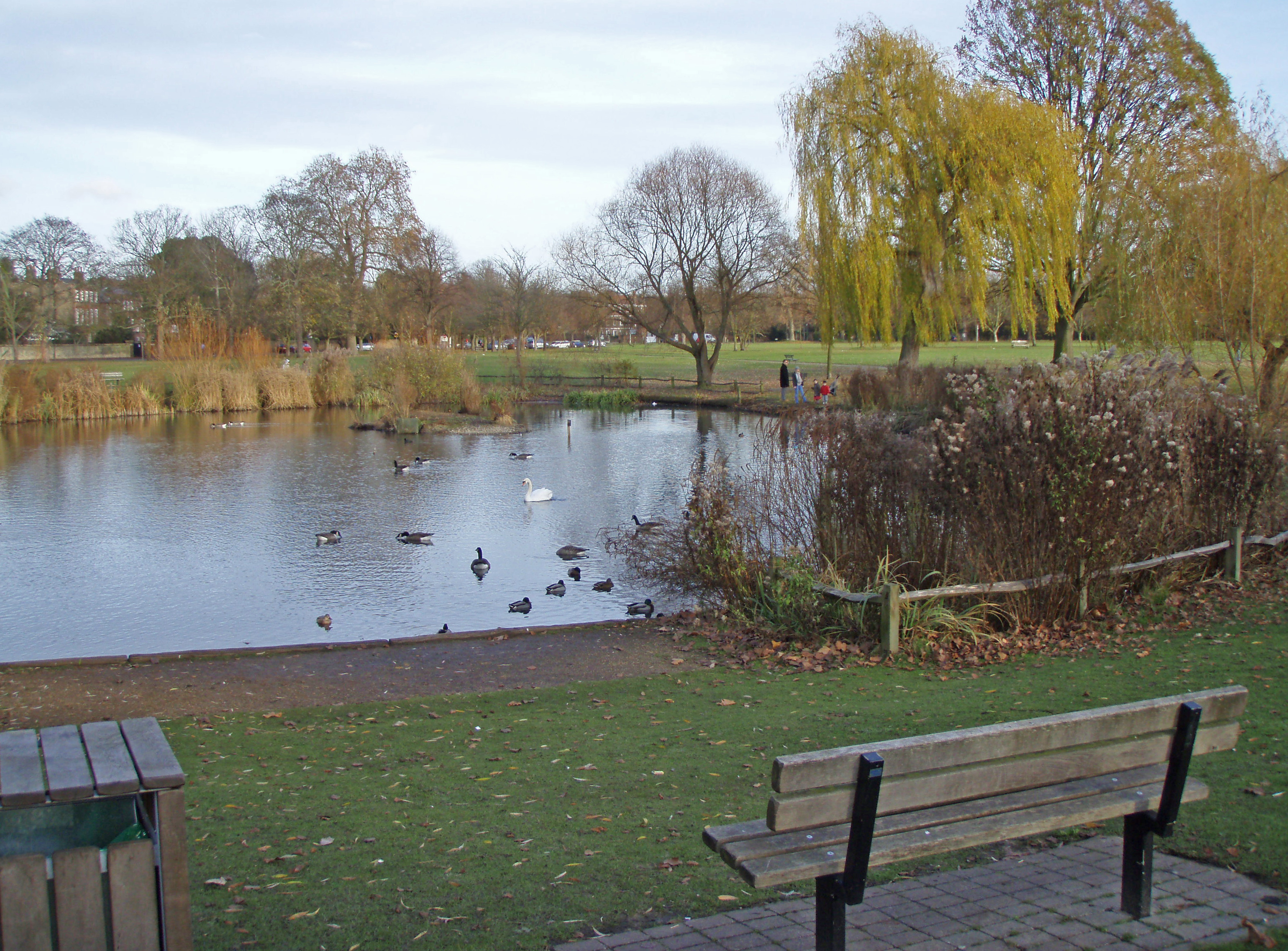
Ham Common provides an important facility for recreation and wildlife.

The bill was challenged, unsuccessfully, in the House of Commons with votes divided 179 in favour to 79 against. The Richmond, Petersham and Ham Open Spaces Act 1902 (2 Edw. 7. c. ccliii) gained royal assent on 18 November 1902.

The act transferred the Dysarts' residual manorial interests in Ham Common and vested them in Ham Urban District Council. The Board of Conservators, established the preceding year, was dissolved in favour of Ham Urban District as well. The Dysart Trustees also gave £3,000 to be invested for the upkeep of the common and any residual money to go to almhouses or other local charitable purposes. Whilst the act achieved its objectives, part of the inclusive settlement with the Dysart Trustees extinguished the remaining lammas rights in Ham, thereby liberating the agricultural land for development. The arrangement was not without critics. Henry Labouchère observed that Lord Dysart "... would get possession of 176 acres of lammas land and secure valuable building rights, notwithstanding that Parliament had decided that no common lands within a radius of fifteen miles of London should be built upon."

Metropolitan Common Scheme (Ham) Amending Scheme Confirmation Act 1954
- Act of Parliament
- Parliament of the United Kingdom
- Long title: An Act to confirm a Scheme for amending a Scheme under the Metropolitan Commons Acts, 1866 to 1898, with respect to Ham Common in the County of Surrey.
- Citation: 2 & 3 Eliz. 2. c. xiii

Dates
- Royal assent: 4 June 1954

The Metropolitan Commons (Ham) Supplemental Act 1901 (1 Edw. 7. c. xxxiii) mistakenly depicted a section of the grounds of Wilmer House as being part of the common. This error was rectified over fifty years later in the Metropolitan Common Scheme (Ham) Amending Scheme Confirmation Act 1954 (2 & 3 Eliz. 2. c. xiii).

== Notable buildings ==
There are many notable buildings around the periphery of Ham Common, including listed buildings and those of Townscape merit.

Ham Common Conservation Area
Image	Building	Dates	Grade	History
	Park Gate House, Ham Gate Avenue	1768 with later alterations	II	It was the home of Lord Charles Beresford at the end of the 19th century and later Laurence Carr. The manor house then belonged to the Vestry family until the 1980s when it was purchased by Khalifa bin Zayed Al Nahyan (1948-2022), ruler of Abu Dhabi. Despite local protests it was extended with a high wall surrounding it. The neighbouring Grade II listed lodge, just inside Richmond Park, dates from 1742. On Ham Gate note the old mileplate on the brick gate pier and the gas lamps.
	Ham Gates			The neighbouring Grade II listed lodge, just inside Richmond Park, dates from 1742. On Ham Gate note the old mileplate on the brick gate pier and the gas lamps.
	Ormeley Lodge, Ham Gate Avenue	Late C17 or early C18 mansion	II*	It was the home of James Goldsmith (1933–1997), billionaire financier, and his family.
	Sudbrook Cottage, Ham Gate Avenue	C18	BTM	The writer and playwright Beverley Nichols (1898–1983) lived here from 1958 until his death.
	The Old Coach House, Petersham Road	c 1720	II	Originally the Coach House and stable for Sudbrook Lodge.
	Sudbrook Lodge, Petersham Road	1680	II*	Rebuilt c1680 by the twice married Elizabeth Wigington who d.1685. She had lived there since about her first marriage in 1618.
	The New Inn, Ham Common	C18	II	Built 1756 as a replacement for the White Hart, an inn that dated from at least 1675.
	Stafford Cottages, Ham Common	Early C18 terrace	II	The oldest on the common, possibly dating from the beginning of the 16th century.
	South Lodge, Ham Common	1856-1862	II	From 1838 to 1848 Alcott House was home of a utopian spiritual community and progressive school founded by James Pierrepont Greaves. The term "New Age" originates from one of their publications. Supporters of Alcott House, or the Concordium, were a key group involved in the formation of the Vegetarian Society in 1847. In 1849 following an outbreak of cholera it was bought by John Minter Morgan as the National Orphan Home for Girls. The present building, 'South Lodge', dates from 1856-1862. The orphanage closed in 1924. After the Second World War it was converted into flats.
	Hardwicke House; Ham Common	C18 or C19	II	Designed in 1688 by Thomas Tryon, merchant, author and early advocate of animal rights and vegetarianism. John and Elizabeth Anne Brome are recorded here in the 1830s and 1841. About 1844 it was bought by John Lewis Cox, the first printer of The Builder in 1842 and master of the Worshipful Company of Stationers in 1848. Hugh Grosvenor, 2nd Duke of Westminster was living here in 1939.
	Orford Place; Ham Common	1730-1734	II	Home of William Golightly from 1786 to his death in 1812. Frances Margaret Hornby (1843–1924), youngest sister of Emily Hornby, lived here from 1909 until her death in 1924. The house was sold in 1925 to Colonel Arthur Spencer Pratt and he changed the name to Orford Hall. In 1949 it was sold to the Anglican Community of the Sisters of the Church who renamed it St Michael's Convent. When they left in 2016 the chapel was demolished and the site converted to flats.
	Avenue Lodge, Ham Common	c 1734	II	
	Avenue Lodge Cottage, Ham Common	1679 with later work	II	
	Avenue Cottage, Ham Common	C17	II	In 1917 this was the home of the Smith family, who son George was killed in France.
	Boxall Cottages, Ham Common	Late C19	BTM	
	Vine Cottage, 38, Ham Common	Georgian	BTM	Originally two houses.
	Selby House, Ham Common	1683 and early C18	II	It was the home of the writer and poet Ann Rolfe (1789–1850) from about 1835 to her death in 1850. She operated a seminary for girls and her husband Edward was schoolmaster at the National School. Frederick Benbow, second son of George Henry Benbow, died here in 1859. Miss Copeland advertised her services in teaching French, German and drawing about 1870. It was then the home of Charles Edward Withall and his family until the late 1880s. The home of the Noble family from 1889 to 1953.
	St Thomas Aquinas R C Church, Ham Street	Late 1880s	BTM	Formerly the parish National school
	The Old Malt House, Lock Road	c 1820	BTM	The old malt house was demolished in 1906 to widen Lock Road. It originally was used for malting by Daniel Light. The cottage is a distinctive building and has an unusual form of gambrel roof with 'kneelers' at the near gable-end. Next to the cottage is the former Ham Urban District Council offices, later the rent office and now a private home.
	Ensleigh Lodge, Ham Common	C 1800	II	According to the Vestry minutes Edmund James had built two houses next to the Malt House, probably Ensleigh Lodge and Laurel Cottage. By the time of the census in 1851 and 1861 the occupant was Joseph Light, described as Maltster and Farmer. It was the home of Nigel Dempster (1941–2007), British journalist, author and broadcaster.
	The Little House, Ham Common	18C	II	Originally called Laurel Cottage it was renamed Ivycroft and was the home of Elizabeth Smith and her sister Sarah Smith (who used the pen name Hesba Stretton) from 1891 to her death in 1911. It was later renamed The Little House.
	Gordon House, Ham Common	C17 or C18	II	Gordon House was the home of Gordon Forbes (1738–1828), a senior officer in the British Army. The house was a school in the mid 19C, after which it was unoccupied and then rented out. It has been home to members of the Shafto family, Carlos Bovill, and Major Alan Bott.
	Flax Cottage, 17, Ham Common	C18	BTM	
	Forbes House, Ham Common	c 1996		Forbes House was once the home of Claude Bowes-Lyon, Lord Glamis. The original Georgian house was demolished in 1935 and replaced by a house designed by Oswald P. Milne. This was also replaced in 1996 by a new house, designed by Julian Bicknell, for Sean O'Brien who founded Telstar Records.
	Langham House, Ham Common	c 1780	II	
	Langham House Close	1956-1958	II*	Built in the former garden of Langham House, designed by James Stirling and James Gowan.
	The Cassel Hospital, Ham Common	1800-1820 with C20 additions	II	It was the home of John Minter Morgan (1782–1854), writer and philanthropist, when it was known as Morgan House. In 1863 it was leased to the Duc de Chartres who had just married his cousin Princess Françoise of Orléans. The first of his four children born here was Princess Marie of Orléans in January 1865. Then in 1879 it became West Heath Girls' School and in the 1930s the Lawrence Hall Hotel. It was bought by the Cassel Foundation in 1947.
	Parkleys Estate	1954-1956	II	Parkleys was the first large-scale residential development by the pioneering SPAN Developments Ltd of Eric Lyons and Geoffrey Townsend. It includes the Parkleys Estate Conservation Area. 25 Ham Farm Road, designed by noted post-war architect Eric Lyons in 1954 and built in 1955 was scheduled to be replaced by a modern design despite appeals by the 20th Century Society.
	Ivy House, Upper Ham Road	Mid to late C18	II	
	Fox House, Upper Ham Road	C18	II	Formerly The Rosary.
	Oak Lodge,, Upper Ham Road	C18	BTM	It was the home of Mrs Ernest Ames (1860 – 1914), author and illustrator of children's books, who died here in 1914. Maurice Craig a pioneering British psychiatrist lived here in 1916. Later Ernest Barkley Raikes OBE QC (1863 – 1931), an English first-class cricketer and member of M.C.C. lived here. The house suffered a direct hit in World War II on 29 November 1940. Although the bomb did not explode both Sydney Clarke (1880–1940) and his wife Dorothy (1900–1940) were killed by concussion. After the war the house was converted into two semi-detached houses and sold in 1949.
	St Andrew's Church, Church Road	1830-1900	II	
	Latchmere House, Church Road	mid C19		During the Second World War it was a British interrogation centre for captured German agents known as Camp 020.

== Recreation ==
Ham Common is a popular local recreational amenity. A horse track crosses the common, linking Richmond Park to the river via the avenue to Ham House. Ham and Petersham Cricket Club play regularly on the common during the season.

Since 1984, the local Ham Amenities Group have organised an annual village fair, usually on the second Saturday of June, in aid of local charities. Travelling fairs and other ad-hoc recreational events also use the common.

Nature on Ham Common

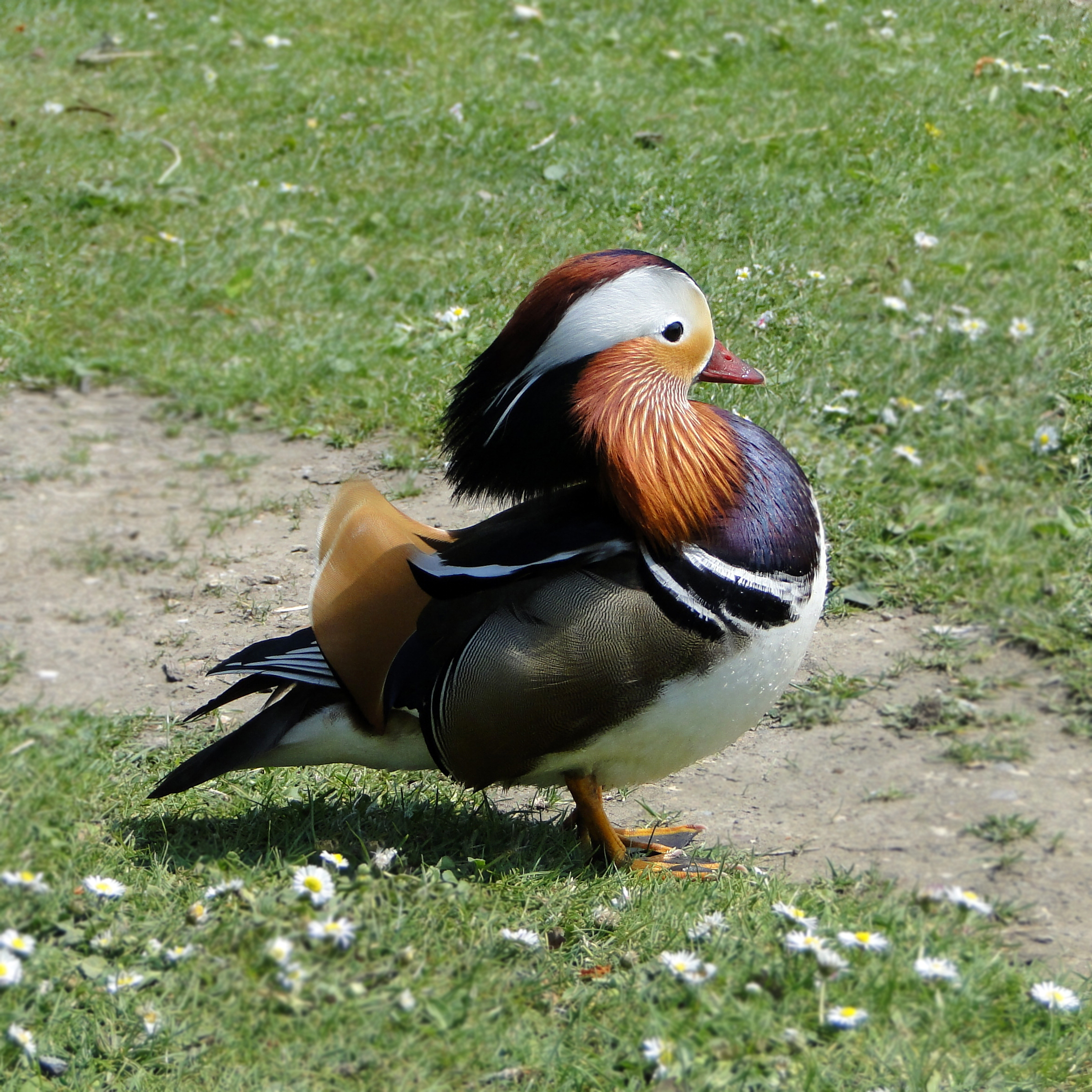
Male Mandarin Duck Aix galericulata on Ham Common

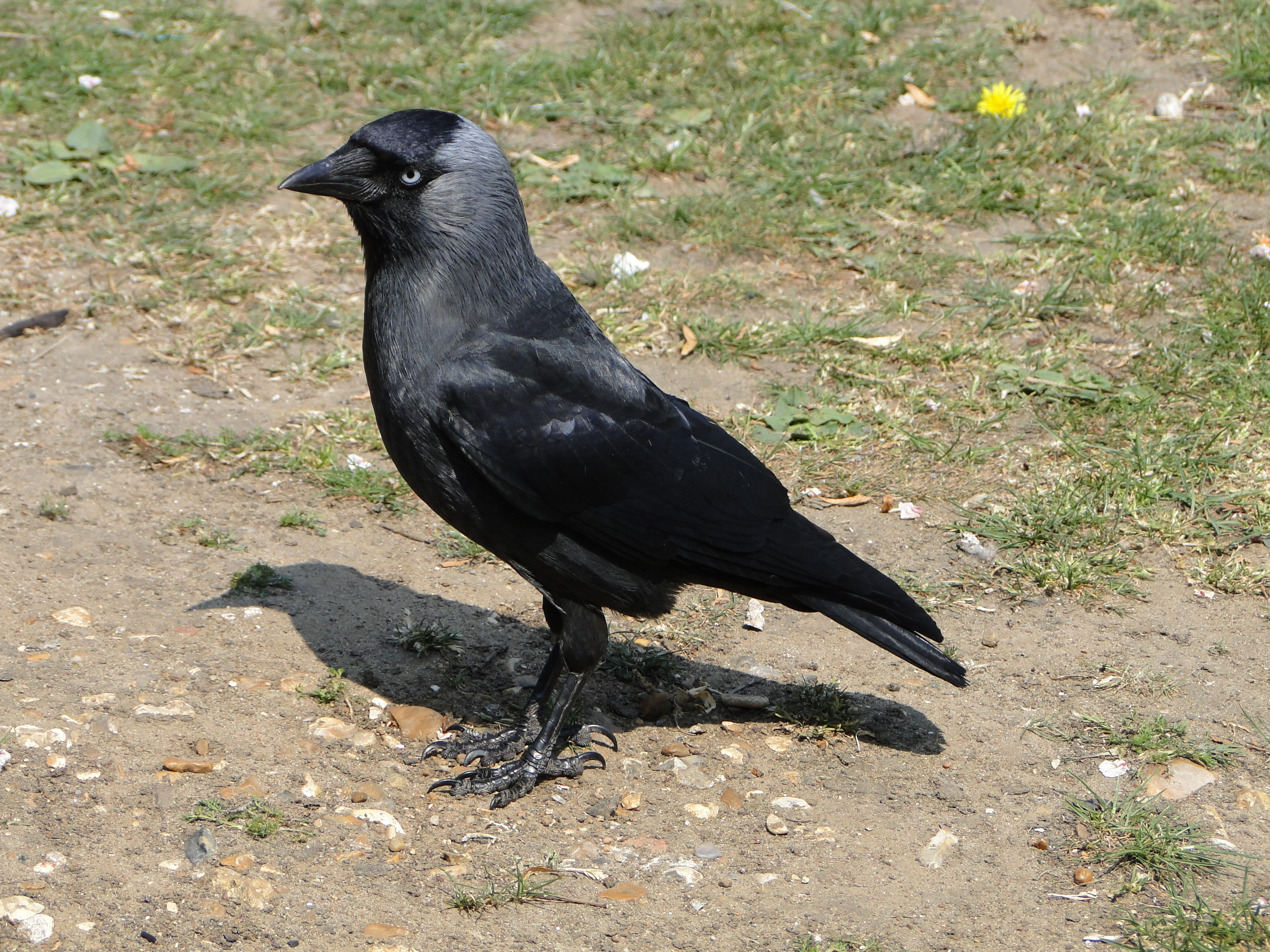
Jackdaw Coloeus monedula on Ham Common

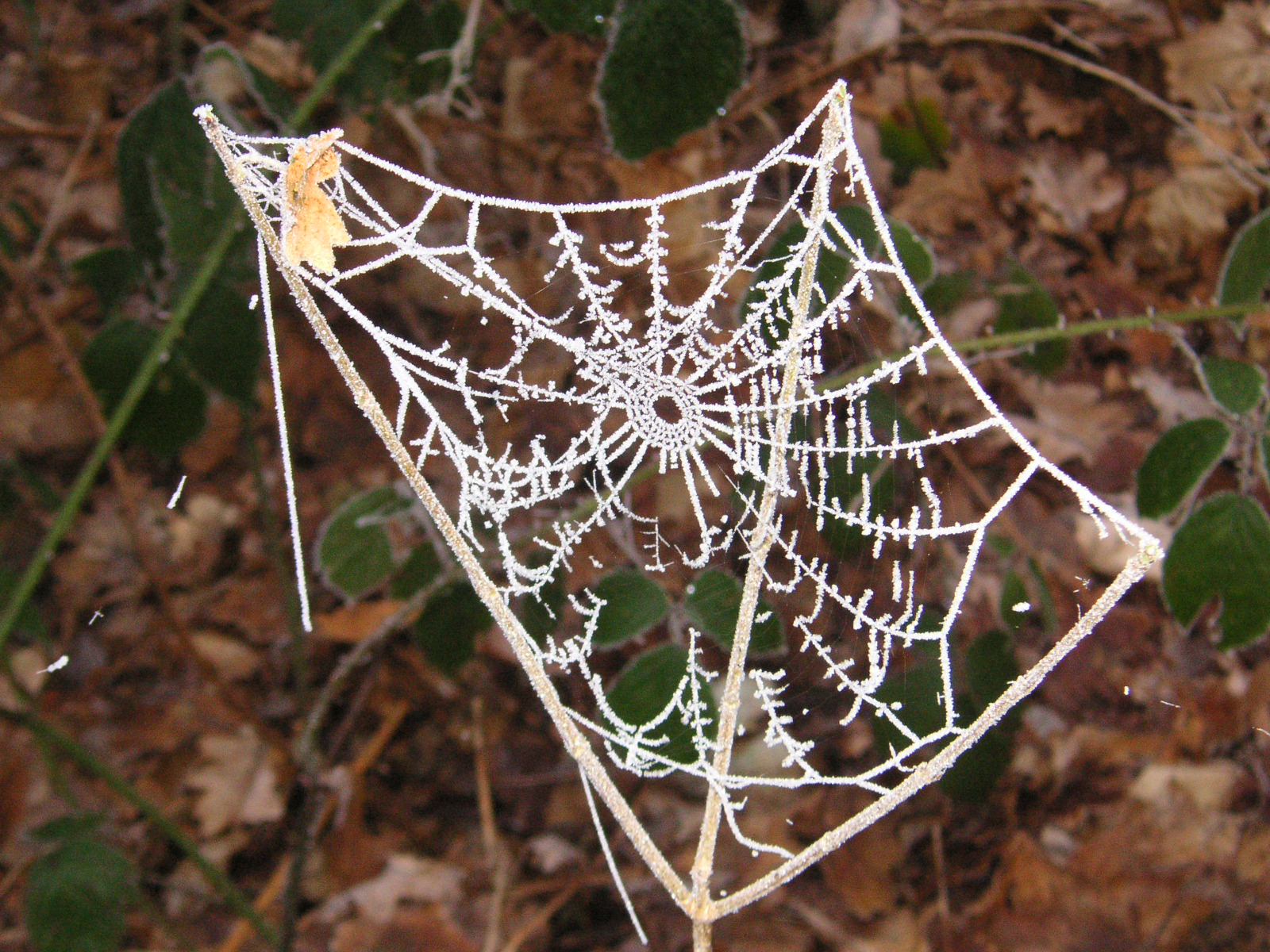
Frost on a web in Harm Woods

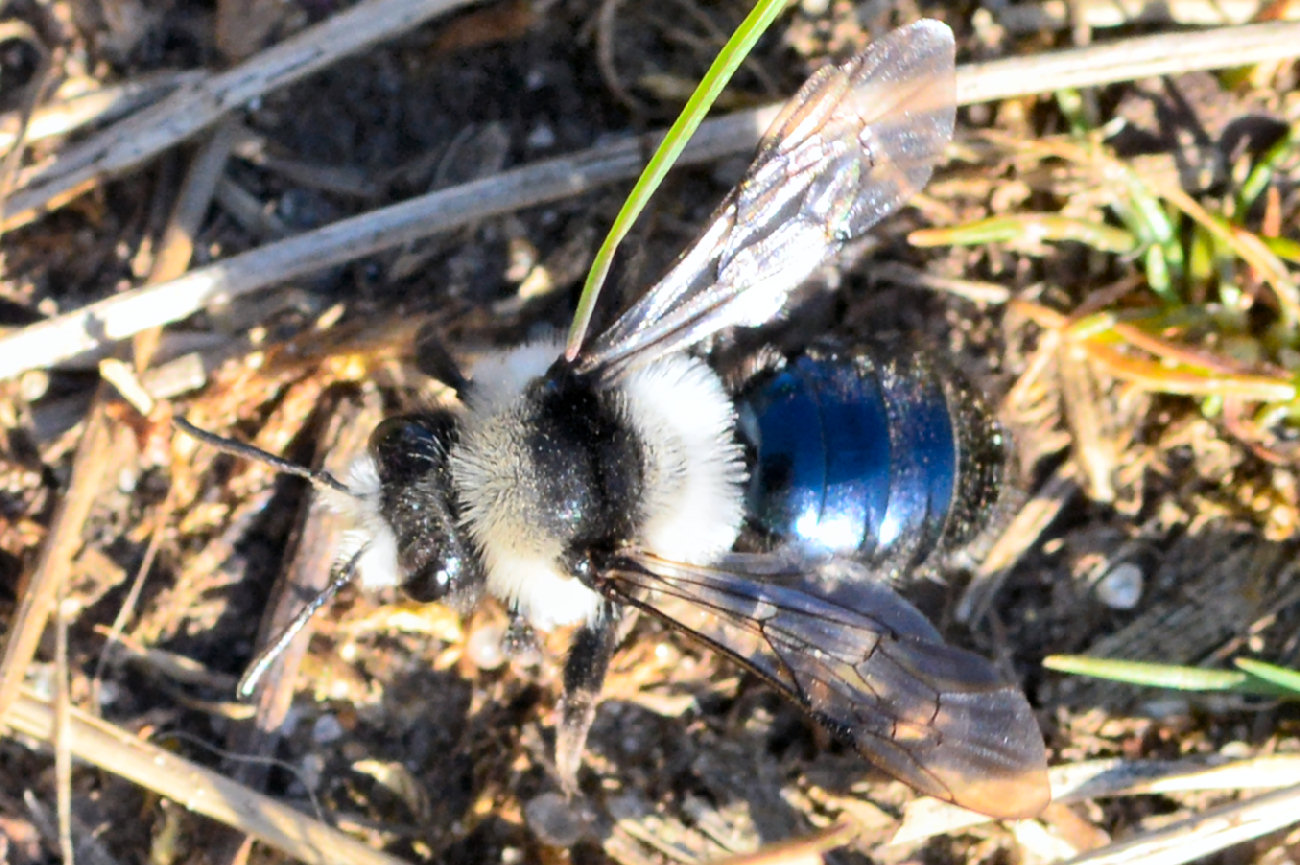
Ashy mining-bee, Ham Common Woods

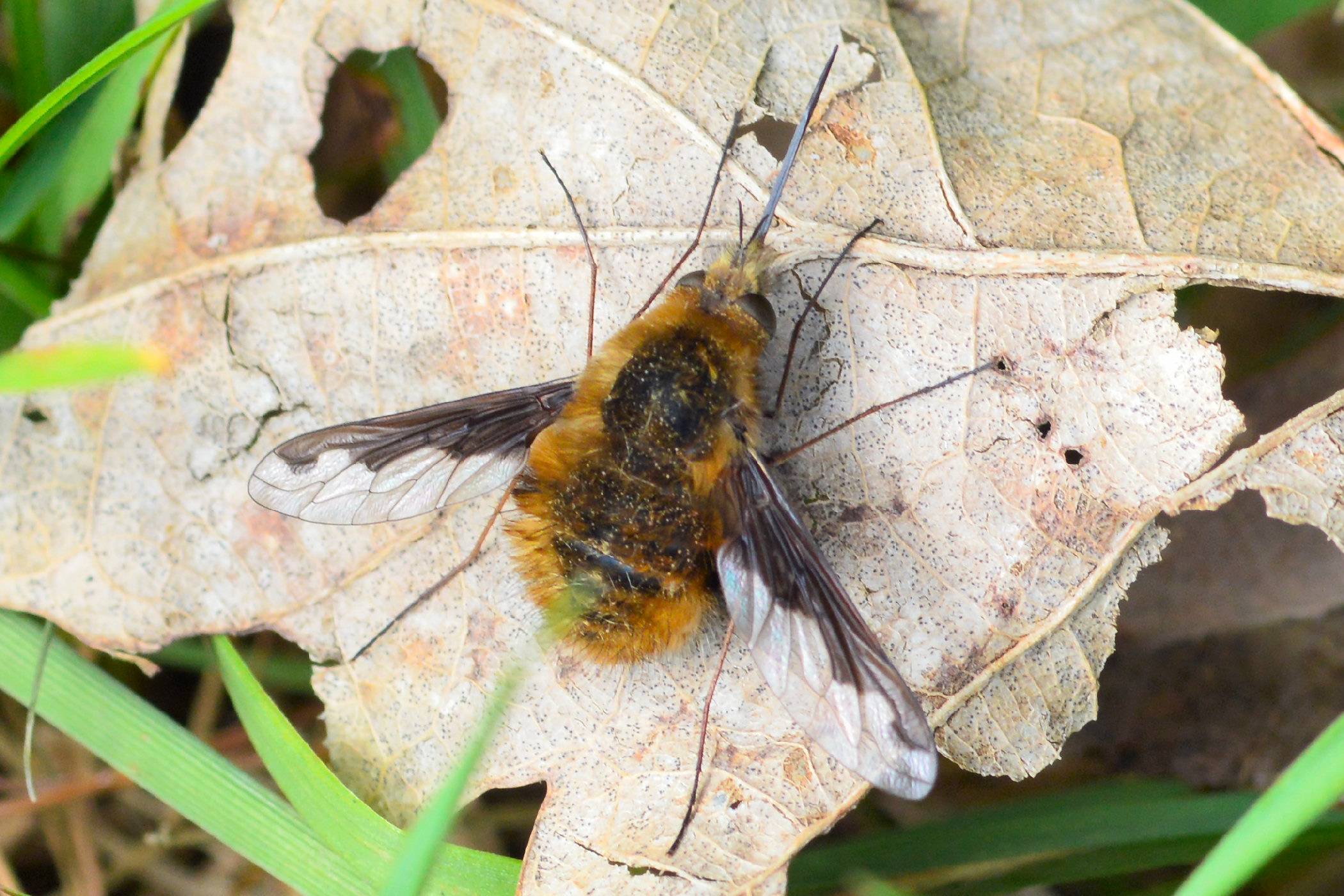
Greater Bee-fly, Ham Common Woods

== Bibliography ==
- Pritchard, Evelyn (1999). A portrait of Ham in Early Victorian times 1840–1860. Ham, London: Alma Publishers. ISBN 0951749757.
