= Palladium Autocars =

Palladium

Overview
- Manufacturer: Palladium Autocars Ltd
- Production: 1911–1924

Powertrain
- Engine: Chapuis-Dornier, Dorman
- Transmission: friction drive, bevel drive, worm drive

The Palladium was a British light car introduced in 1911 by Palladium Autocars Ltd of 378 Euston Road, London, then from mid-1913 at Normand Road, West Kensington, and post-WW1 at Felsham Road, Putney. From 1913 the company also made commercial vehicles, including vans, lorries, and buses.

== Pre-WW1 cars ==
Palladium cars were initially assembled from French components. Rated at 12/16HP, they were 4 seaters with 4 cylinder engines, priced at £275, and were backed by a 5-year guarantee. By October 1912 the range had been extended to 10/14HP, 12/16HP, 15/18HP, and 18/24HP, all available with open or closed bodies. In 1914 the range had been reduced to three models, now rated as 10/18HP (£268), 12/22HP (£335) and 18/30HP (£450), however the war intervened and the factory had to suspend production of cars.

== Post-WW1 cars ==
In 1919 Palladium revealed a prototype cyclecar with a flat twin air-cooled engine. This had a fan built into the flywheel which drew cooling air over the cylinders and cylinder heads via ducting, a design which they patented, however it was not to go into production. They continued production of their commercial vehicles and it was 1922 before they came back to the market with a car - this time with a Dorman engine. This was sold as the Palladium Light Twelve. Production appears to be short lived, with no mention of new Palladium vehicles after 1924.

== Commercial Vehicles ==
Palladium Autocars branched out into commercial vehicles around 1913, in which year they moved to larger premises at Normand Rd. In January 1914 they were producing 12cwt, 15cwt and 25cwt chassis, all fitted with 4 cylinder side-valve engines and cardan shaft with bevel driven rear axle. Later in 1914 Commercial Motor magazine reported on the London-built 15cwt Palladium delivery van, which had been "on the market for some considerable time past". The van was fitted with a 4-cylinder engine of 3.5in bore and 5in stroke, 4 speed gearbox and worm drive rear axle.

Commercial vehicle production continued after the war (during which Palladium was making aircraft parts), and at the 1920 commercial vehicle show at Olympia Palladium exhibited a 4-ton lorry chassis, and a 30-seater bus, with a corridor body with a folding roof. The Palladium buses proved quite robust in service, and Provincial Tramways (Grimsby) modernised their Palladium buses with new bodies and pneumatic tyres in 1928. However manufacture of Palladium commercial vehicles seems to have ceased around 1924.
