= The New Inn, Ham Common =

Pub in Ham, London

Coordinates: 51°26′10″N 0°18′18″W

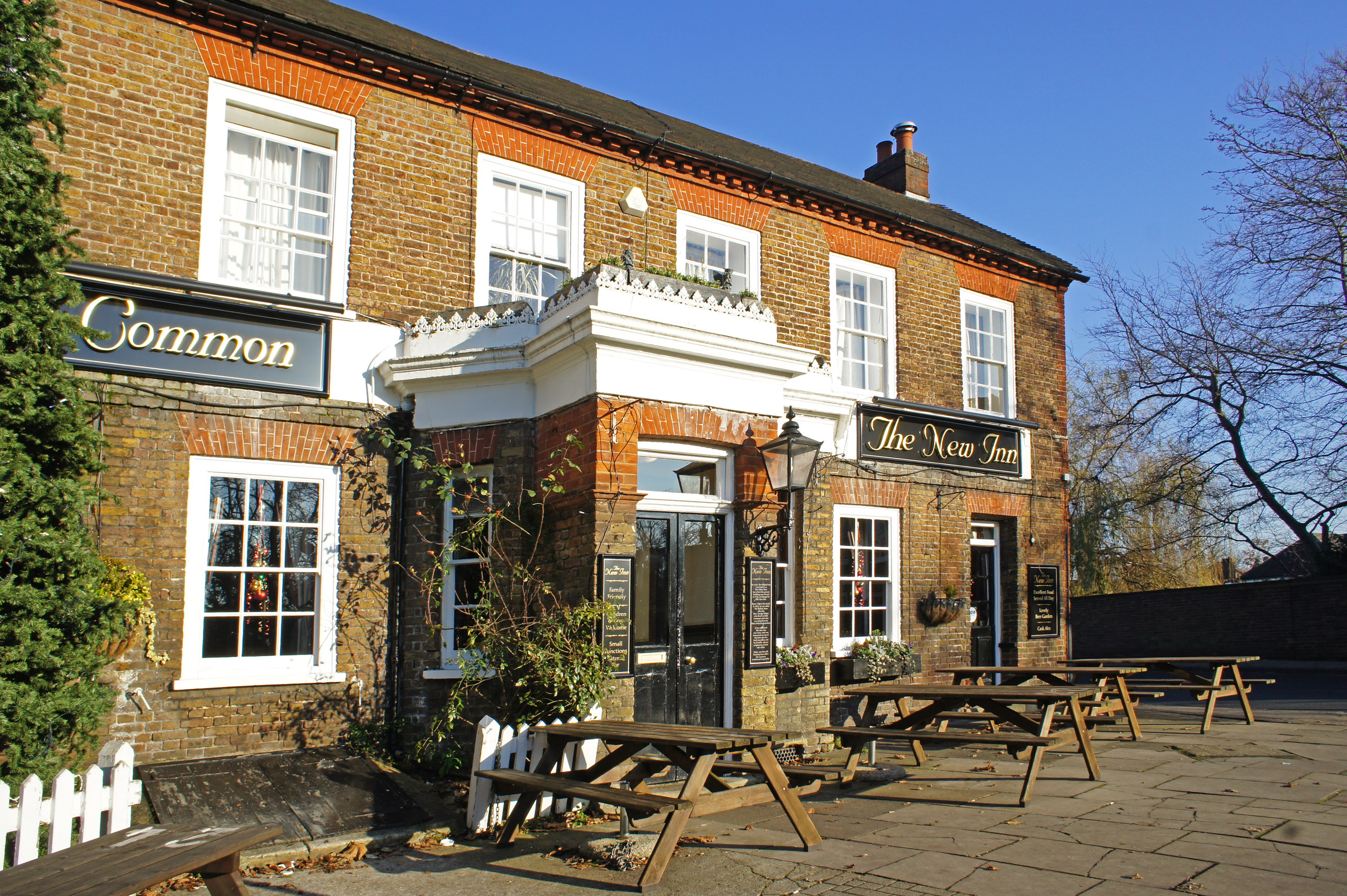

- Location within London Borough of Richmond upon Thames

General information
- Type: Public house
- Location: Ham Common, Ham in the London Borough of Richmond upon Thames.

Listed Building – Grade II
- Official name: The New Inn public house
- Designated: 25 June 1983
- Reference no.: 1080827

The New Inn is a Grade II listed public house on Ham Common, Ham in the London Borough of Richmond upon Thames. It dates from the 18th century.

It was used as a filming location for the pub of the same name in the television series The Sandman and for the Waitrose Christmas advert 2025.
