= Jacomb-Hood =

- Language: English

Origin
- Meaning: Double-barelled surname from Jacomb and Hood
- Region of origin: England

Other names
- Variant form: Jacomb Hood

Jacomb-Hood, also Jacomb Hood, is an English surname. Notable people with the name include:

- Agnes E. Jacomb (1866–1949), English novelist who used the surname Jacomb-Hood as a pseudonym
- George Percy Jacomb-Hood (1857–1929), British painter and illustrator
- Robert Jacomb-Hood (1822–1900), British railway engineer
- John Wykeham Jacomb-Hood (1859–1914), British railway engineer best known for his work on London Waterloo station
