= Old Palace Lane =

Street in London, England

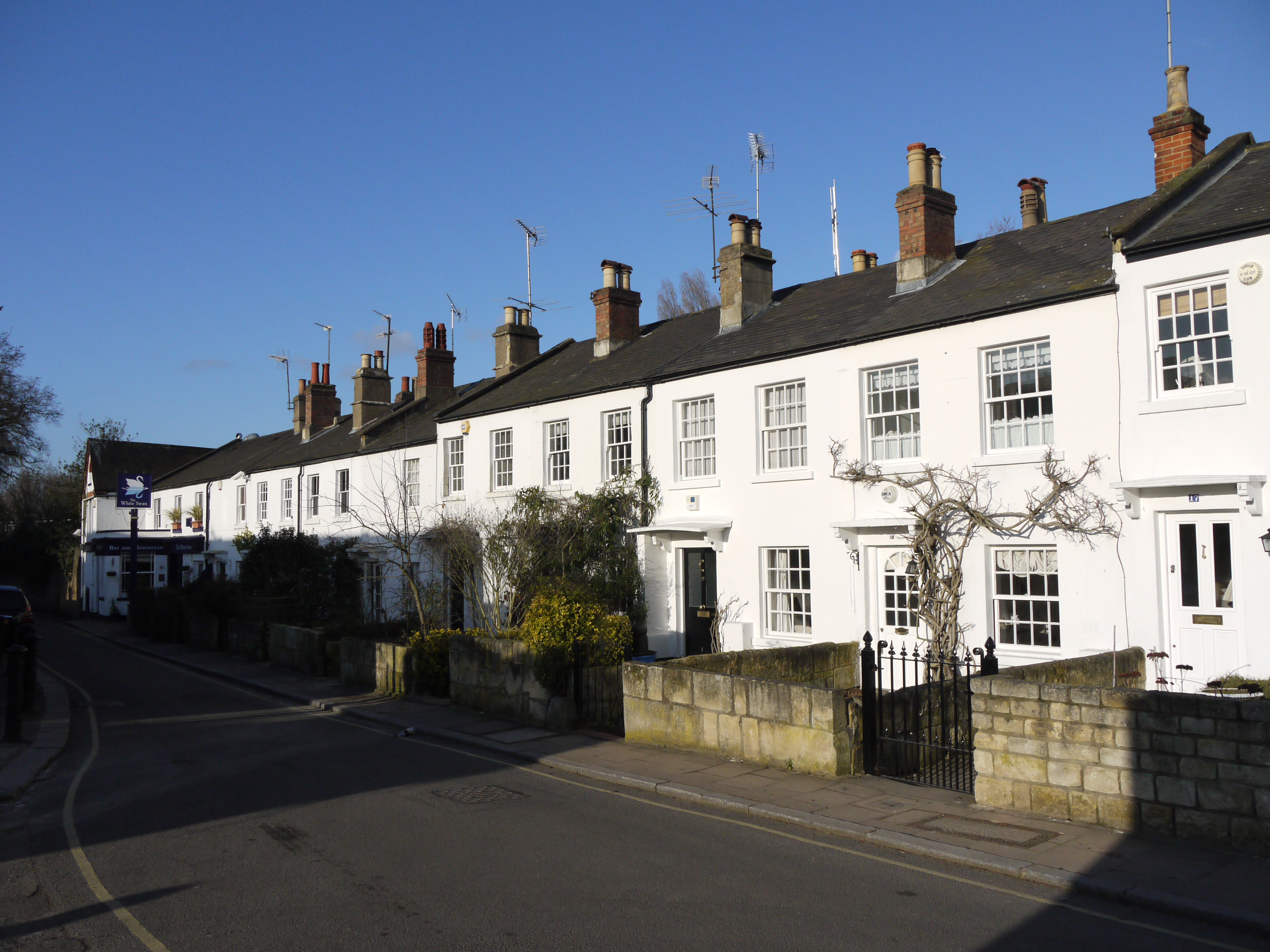
Old Palace Lane. Regency era houses and the White Swan pub

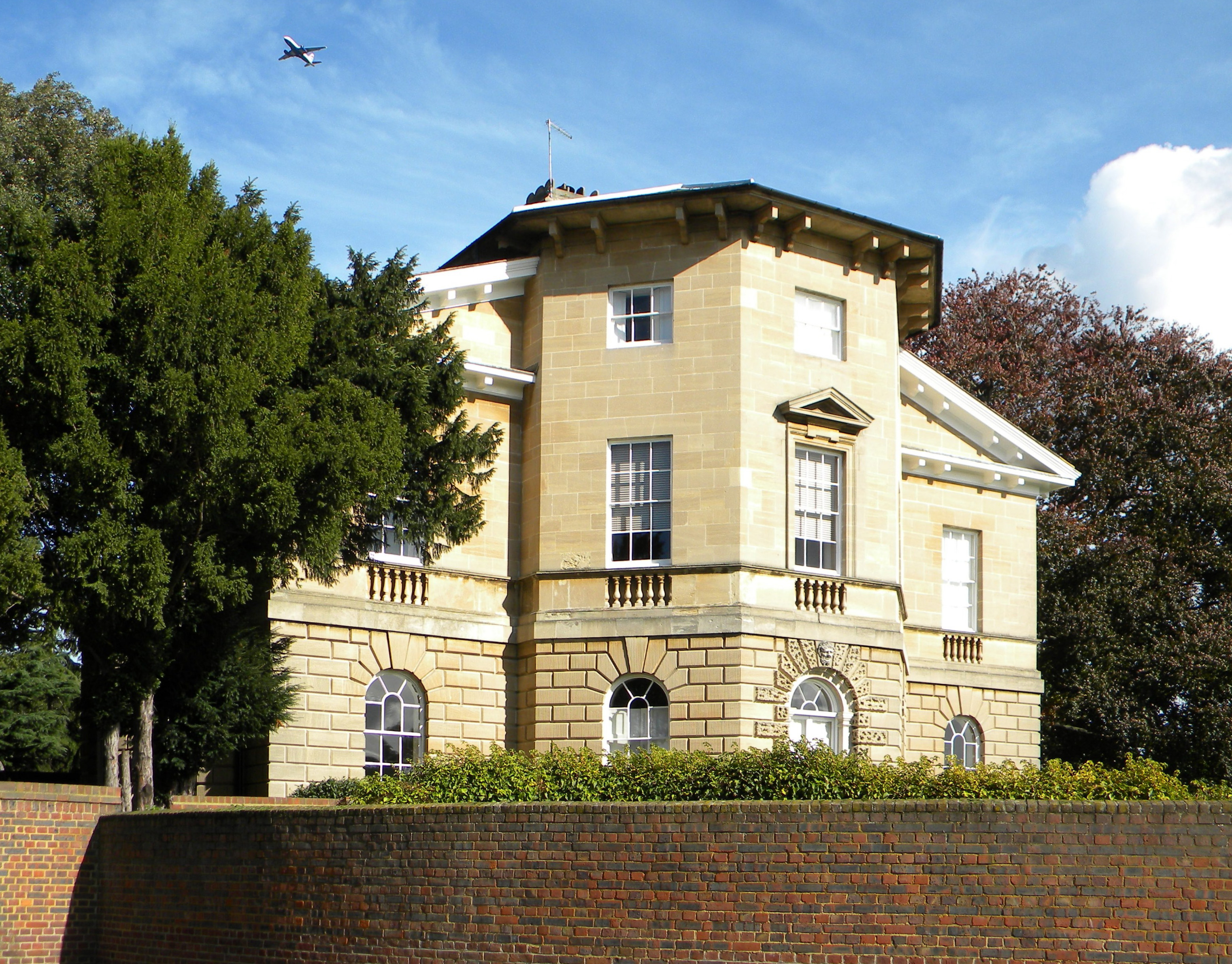
Asgill House at the southern end of the Lane

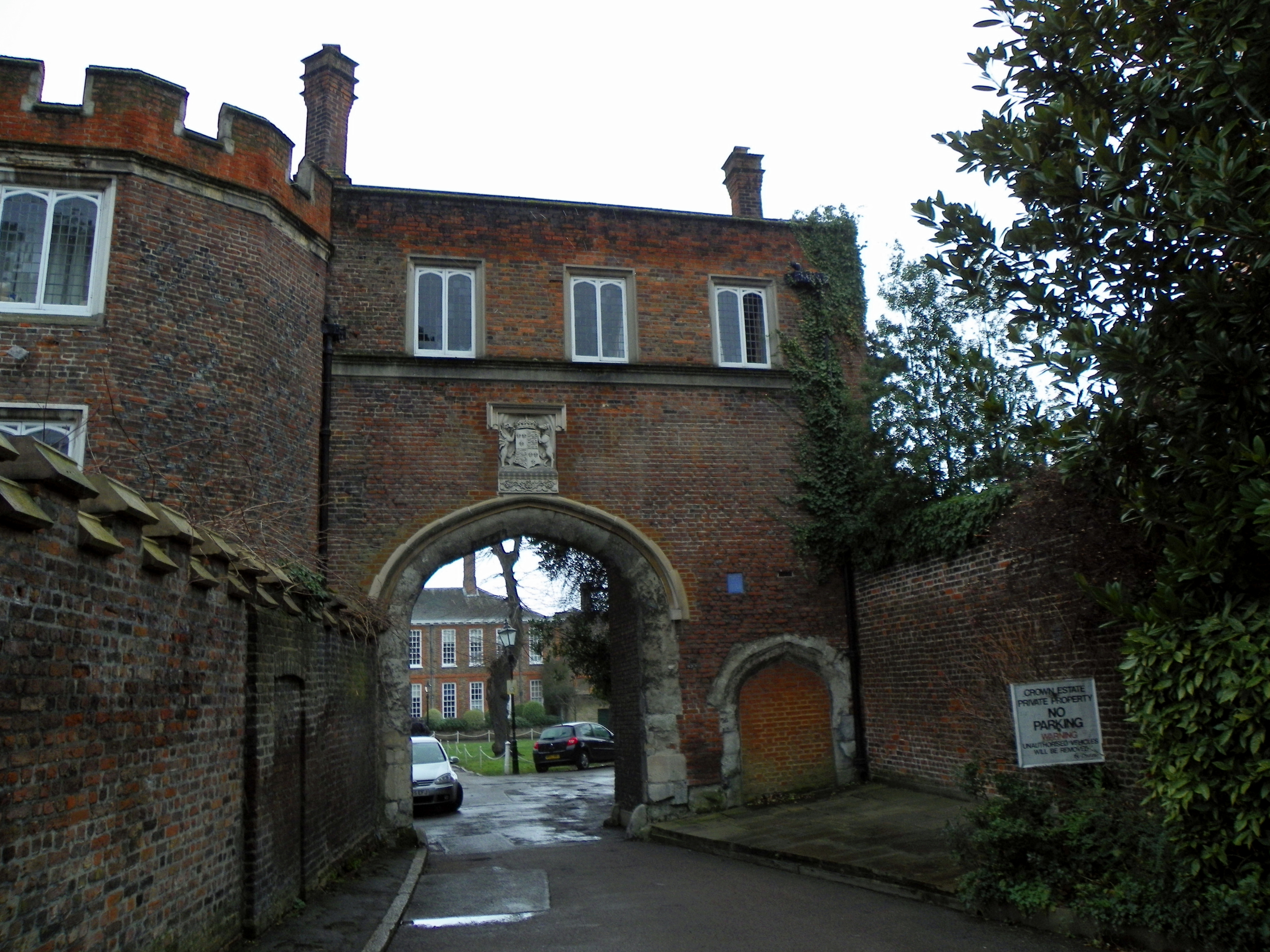
The former Gate House of Richmond Palace with Old Palace Yard visible beyond it

Old Palace Lane is a street in Richmond in the London Borough of Richmond upon Thames, running westwards off Richmond Green down towards the River Thames. It takes its name from the historic Richmond Palace, constructed during the reign of Henry VII and demolished during the 1650s. The Palladian villa Asgill House was built in the 1760s at the river end of the street.

In the 1840s the viaduct approach to the new Richmond Railway Bridge was built just to the north of the Lane. Beyond it is Old Deer Park and the A316 road approach to Twickenham Bridge. Several buildings in the street are now Grade II listed while Asgill House is Grade I listed.

Old Palace Yard (the former Great Courtyard of Richmond Palace, and known as Wardrobe Court until 1838) is a curving street running off Old Palace Lane and connecting it with Richmond Green. It contains the only main surviving structure from the former palace, its Tudor gatehouse, which is at the entrance with the Green. Also in the Yard is The Trumpeters' House, an early eighteenth-century house which is now Grade I listed.

== Bibliography ==
- Nairn, Ian; Pevsner, Nikolaus; Cherry, Bridget. Surrey. Yale University Press, 2002. ISBN 978-0-3002347-8-7.
- Members of the Richmond Local History Society (Fourth edition). The Streets of Richmond and Kew. Richmond Local History Society, 2022. ISBN 978-1-9123140-3-4.
- Robinson, Derek; Fowler, Simon (Second edition). Old Palace Lane: Medieval to Modern Richmond. Richmond Local History Society and Museum of Richmond, 2020. ISBN 978-1-9123140-2-7.
