= Kingston Railway Bridge =

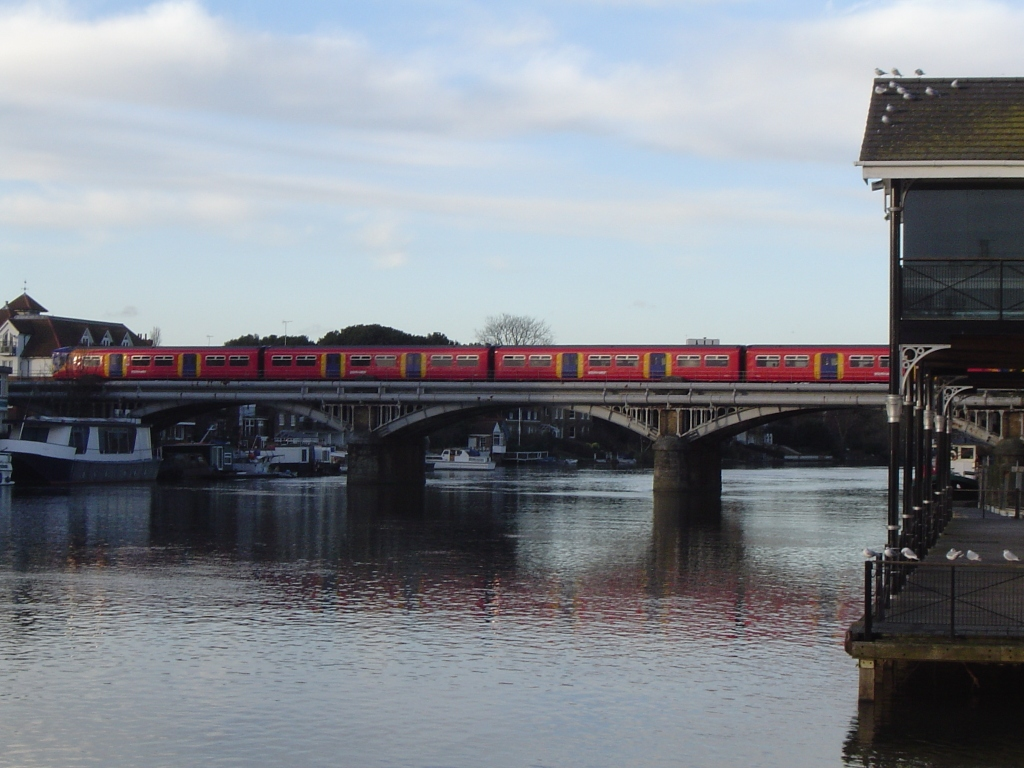
- South West Trains service crossing Kingston Railway Bridge
- Coordinates: 51°24′48.66″N 0°18′30.49″W
- Carries: Kingston–Richmond loop line
- Crosses: River Thames
- Locale: Kingston upon Thames

Characteristics
- Material: Steel
- Height: 22 feet 4 inches (6.81 m)
- Longest span: 22 feet 11 inches (6.99 m)
- No. of spans: 5
- Piers in water: 2

History
- Designer: John Wykeham Jacomb-Hood
- Opened: 1863

Location
- Interactive map of Kingston Railway Bridge

Kingston Railway Bridge in Kingston upon Thames, Greater London, crosses the River Thames on the reach above Teddington Lock. It carries the Kingston Loop Line train service (for passengers only) from London Waterloo station, where the majority of services begin and end and which line includes a maintenance depot. The loop diverges from main lines at New Malden and Richmond. East and west of the bridge along the line are Kingston and Hampton Wick stations. The loop returns to the south bank of its terminus via Richmond Railway Bridge. The loop feeds a branch line, a further incentive for the 1863 construction of the bridge, the Shepperton branch line.

== History ==
The present bridge was designed by John Wykeham Jacomb-Hood and built in 1907, replacing a cast-iron bridge designed by J E Errington, first discussed in 1860 and completed in 1863.

The bridge has five arches: three span the Thames; two span dry land, which on the Kingston bank includes a road. The bridge has elevated track approaches varying from on viaduct to on embankment, which navigate curves and fly over an urban grid of roads.

Twin power stations were close to the bridge on the Kingston bank from 1893 to 1959 as to one and from 1948 to 1980 as to the later. Being close to the Thames, coal came up river by barge, and ash was sent away the same way. The barge dock was constructed at Kingston Railway Bridge close to the present the upstream entrance to Canbury Gardens. Much of these sites has been landscaped for public park use and accommodates high-specification 21st century mid- and high-rise apartments.

== Operational use ==
The bridge carries the South Western compass sector operator's suburban Kingston Loop, with trains starting and ending at its sole London terminus: Waterloo. The loop diverges from main lines at New Malden and Twickenham. Within 400 m along the line from the bridge are Kingston (to the east) and Hampton Wick (to the west). The loop returns to the south bank of the Thames via Richmond Railway Bridge on the combined, major Windsor and Reading (from Waterloo) line. The loop also feeds a branch line, the Shepperton Branch Line.

=== Complementary uses ===
When part of the Kingston Loop is unable to operate, the bridge enables continued passenger services, typically using the capacity of bay platform 1 at Kingston railway station, the only example on the loop. The Shepperton Branch Line branches off the loop about halfway between the two Thames bridges, and the capacity of a bay platform means various service patterns have been used since the bridge was built. Both lines are used entirely for stopping services, except when either main line is diverted, more typically the Windsor and Reading lines which must be diverted via Kingston or via Hounslow when the busiest stretches of that line are being repaired. The loop has Strawberry Hill maintenance depot which can accommodate a few regular trains.

== See also ==
- Crossings of the River Thames
- Kingston Loop Line
- London and South Western Railway
- List of bridges in London

Next crossing upstream	River Thames	Next crossing downstream
Kingston Bridge	Kingston Railway Bridge	Teddington Lock Footbridges
