= Asgill House =

Historic home in Richmond, London

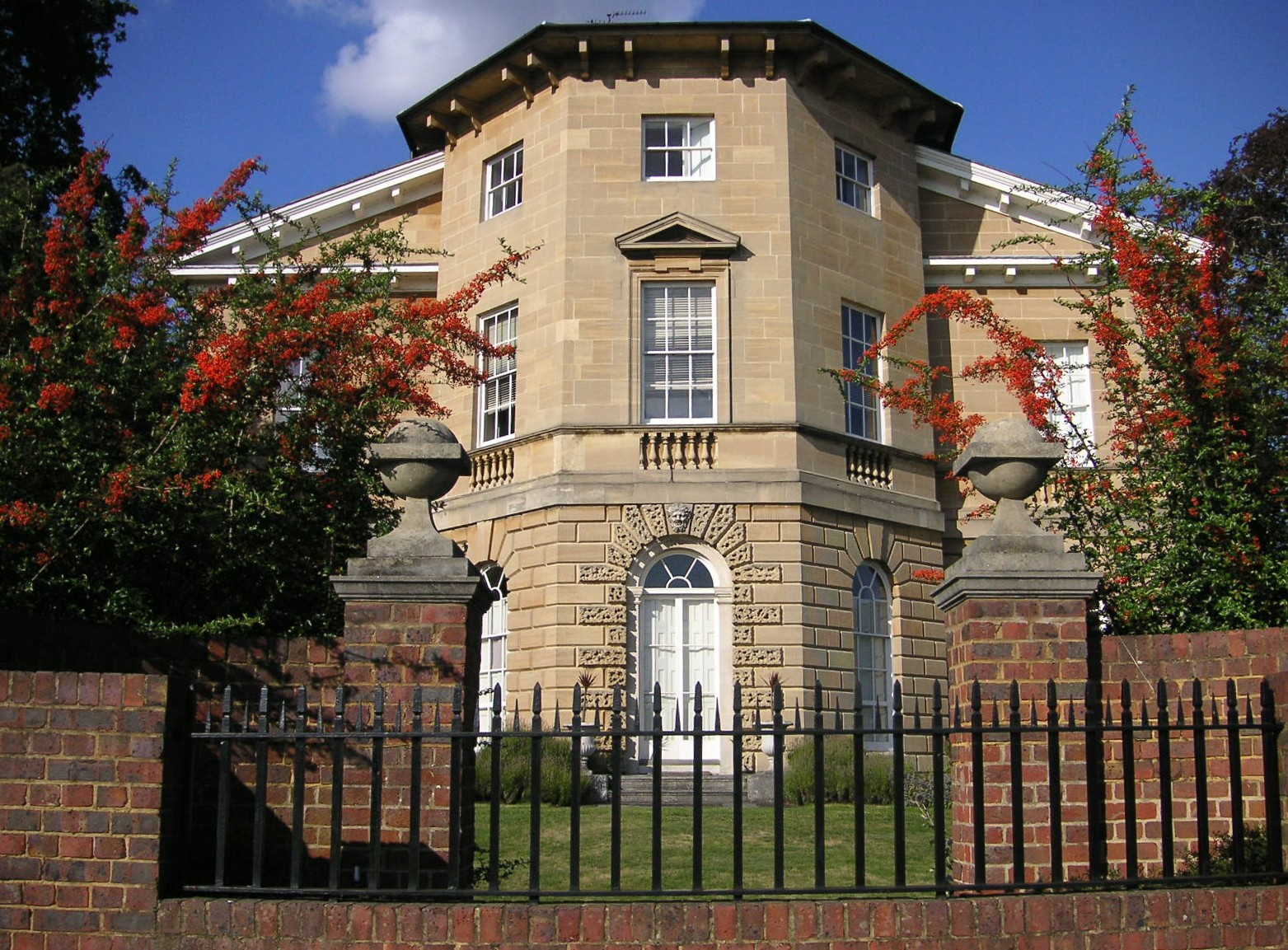

- Location within London Borough of Richmond upon Thames

General information
- Type: Villa
- Architectural style: Palladian
- Location: Old Palace Lane, Richmond, London, England
- Coordinates: 51°27′37″N 0°18′44″W
- Construction started: 1757–58

Design and construction
- Architect: Sir Robert Taylor

Listed Building – Grade I
- Official name: Asgill House
- Designated: 10 January 1950
- Reference no.: 1180412

Richmond Place, now known as Asgill House, is a Grade I listed 18th-century Palladian villa on Old Palace Lane in Richmond, London (historically in Surrey), overlooking the River Thames. The house is on the former site of the river frontage and later the brewhouse for the medieval and Tudor Richmond Palace. It is 8 miles (13 km) from Charing Cross and was built in 1757–58 by Sir Robert Taylor as a summer and weekend parkland villa beside the river for the merchant banker Sir Charles Asgill, who was Lord Mayor of London in 1757–58. It has been described as "among the last villas of importance to be erected on the banks of the Thames".

It was returned to its original appearance in a restoration of 1969–70 by the then-leaseholder Fred Hauptfuhrer, aided by Donald Insall Associates. This included removing the Victorian extensions.

Asgill House has been leased from the Crown Estate since 1983 by the Asgill House Trust. (Note: Asgill House Trust is a company (no. 01701275) limited by guarantee and a registered charity (no. 286270).) The trust preserves and maintains this historic house as a heritage asset.

The rear garden contained a 200-year-old copper beech tree, one of the Great Trees of London, which had been planted by Mrs Elizabeth Palmer on 4 October 1813 to celebrate the birth of her grandson; the tree died in the winter of 2013/14.

== Gallery ==
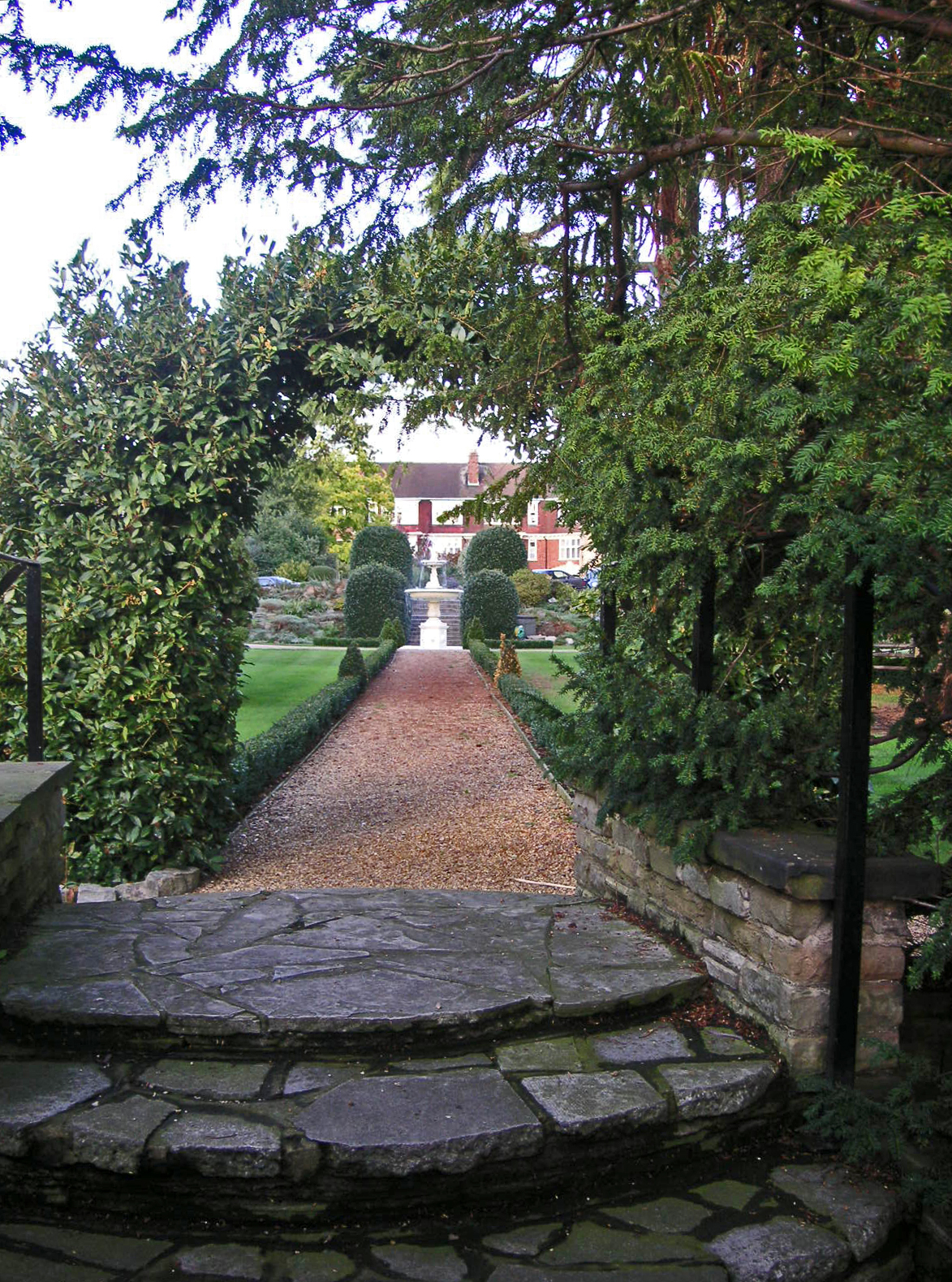
Asgill House's garden

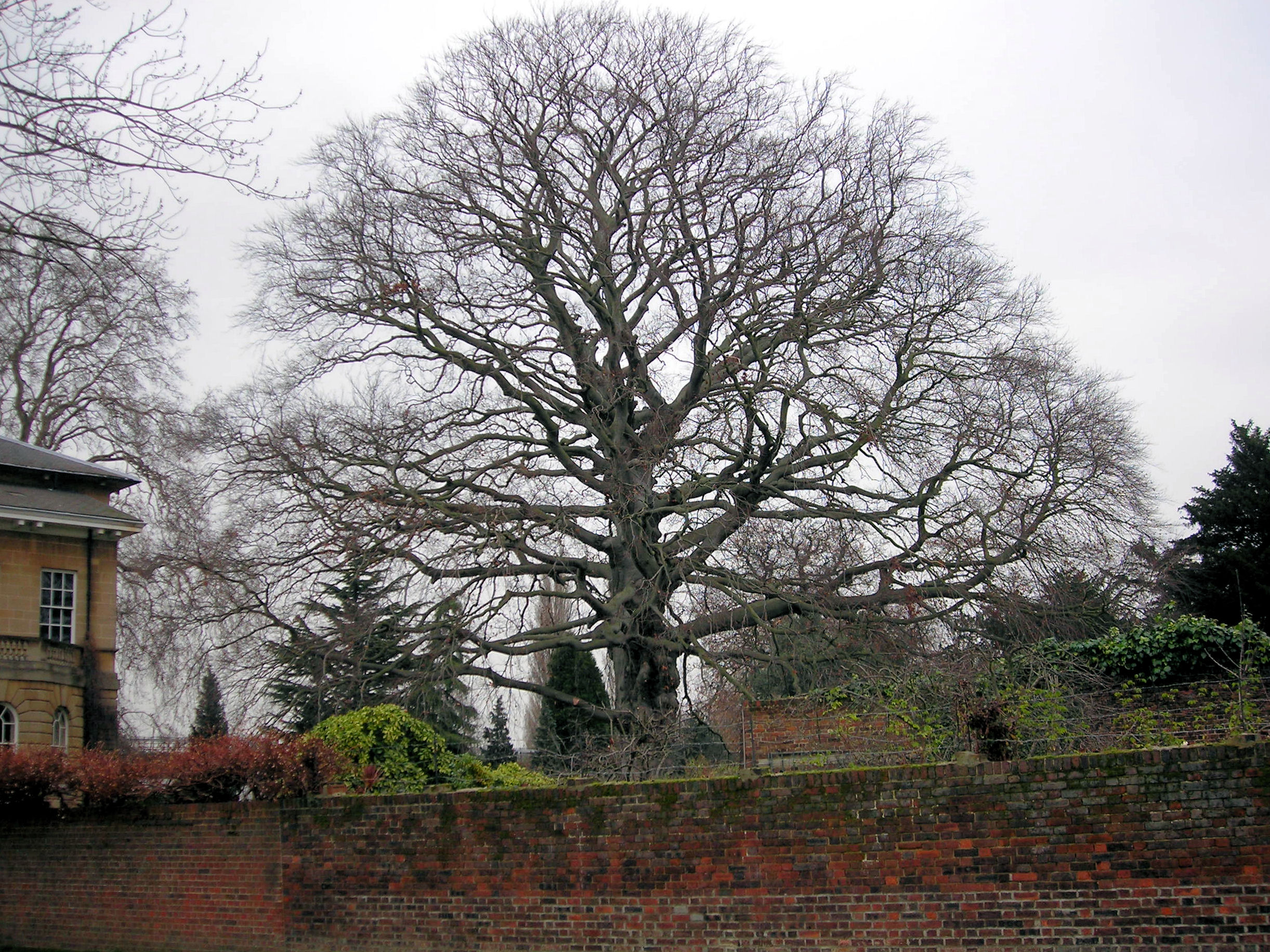
Asgill House's copper beech tree, which was planted in 1813 and died in the winter of 2013/14

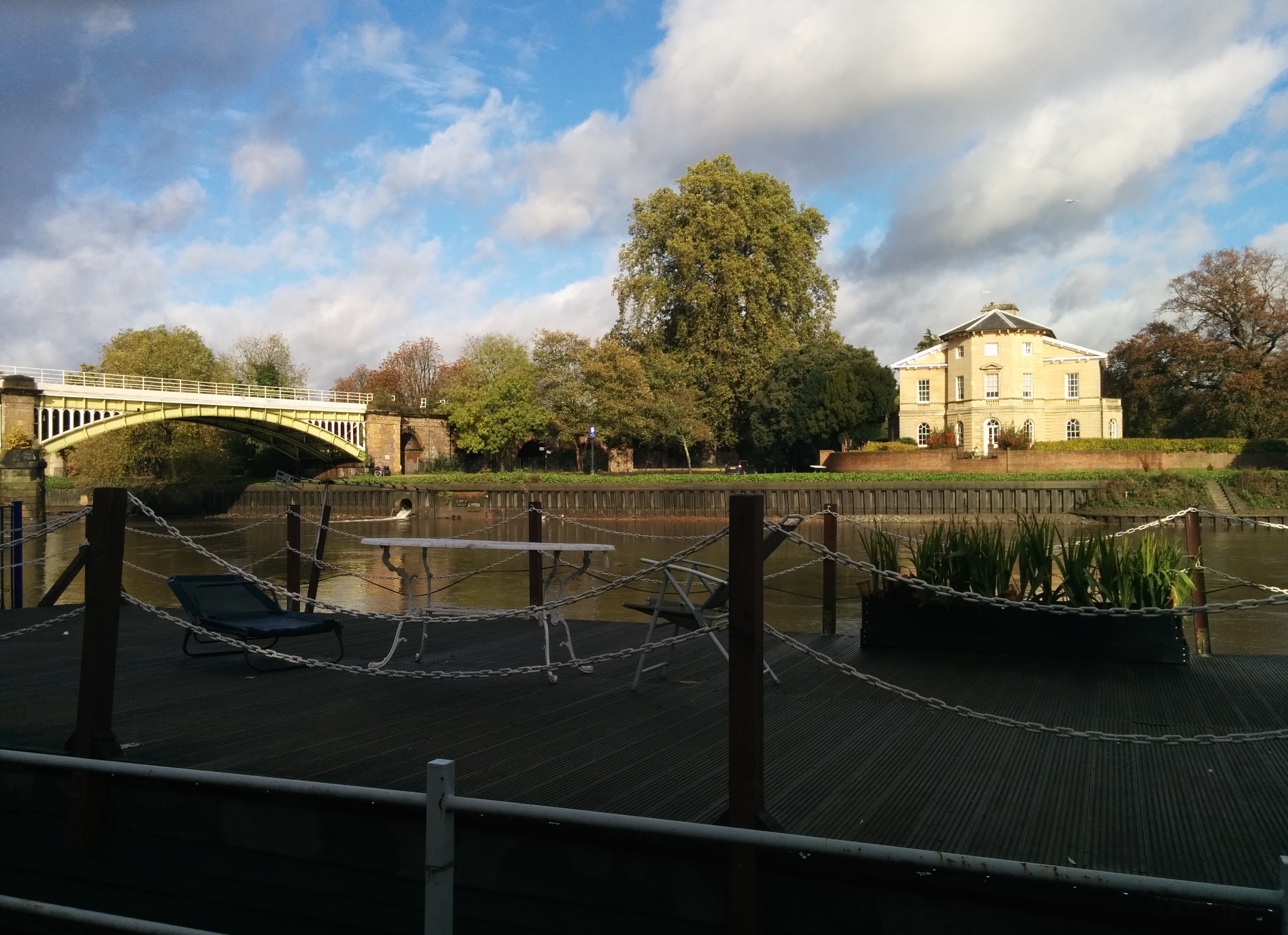
Richmond Railway Bridge (1846) and Asgill House (1757) viewed from the River Thames

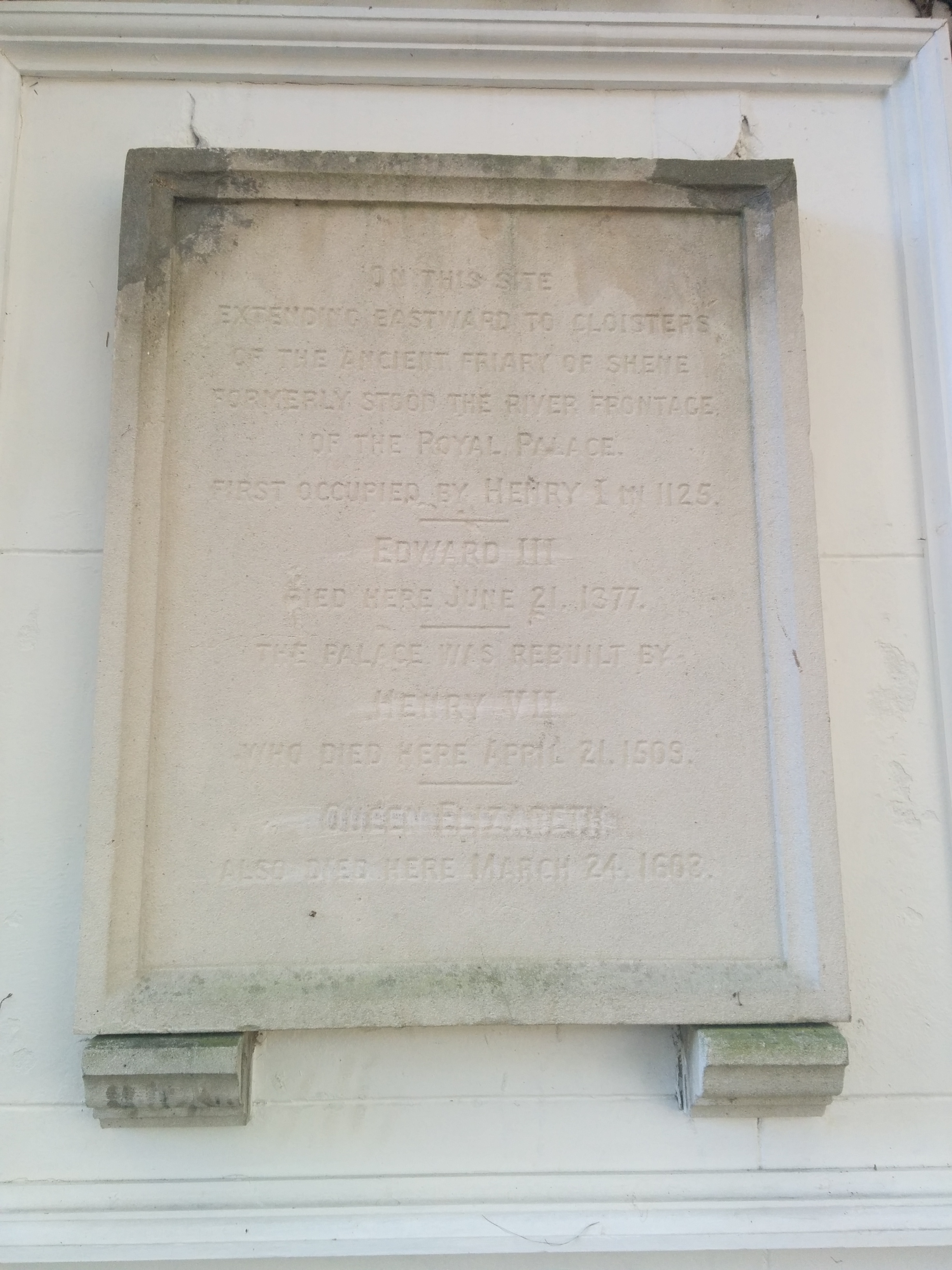
Plaque on the exterior wall commemorating Henry I, Edward III, Henry VII and Elizabeth I as residents of Richmond Palace

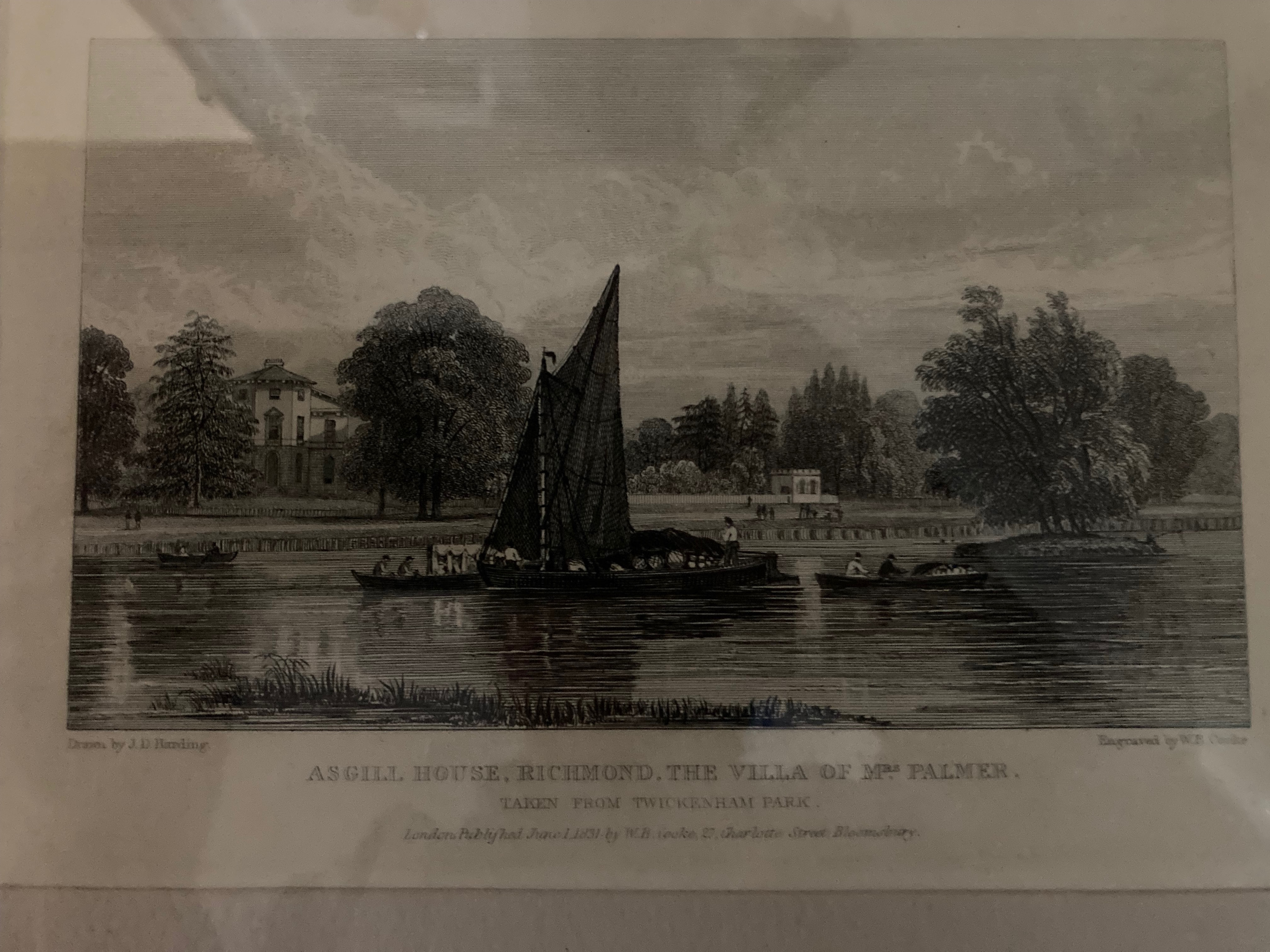
1831 lithograph as The Villa of Mrs Palmer

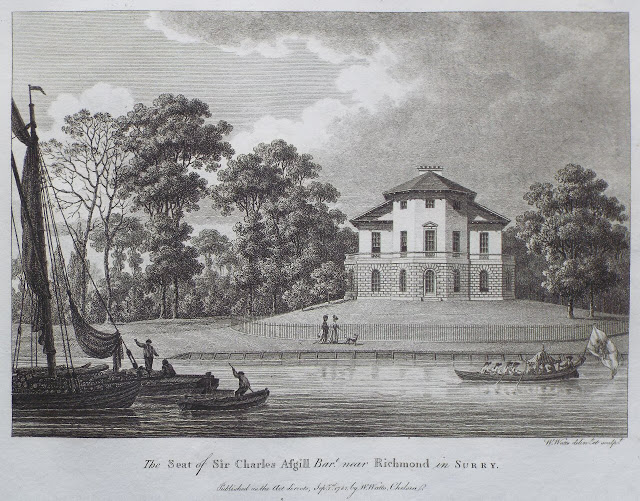
1781 engraving of Asgill House
