= Vernon Robertson =

British civil engineer

Vernon Robertson CBE, MC
- Born: Vernon Alec Murray Robertson; 29 December 1890; Calcutta, India
- Died: 12 February 1971 (aged 80)
- Engineering career
- Discipline: Civil, railway
- Institutions: Fellow and President of the Institution of Civil Engineers; Fellow and President of the Permanent Way Institution

Vernon Alec Murray Robertson, CBE, MC and bar (29 December 1890 – 12 February 1971) was a British civil engineer in the railway sector. During the First World War he served with the Royal Engineers with distinction, earning the Military Cross twice. Robertson later worked for a number of railway companies before becoming Chief Civil Engineer to the London Passenger Transport Board, Southern Railway and the Southern Region of British Railways. During and after the Second World War he returned to the army and served with, and commanded, the Engineer and Railway Staff Corps. Robertson served as president of the Institution of Civil Engineers for 1949–50.

== Early life and First World War ==
Robertson was born in 1890 at Calcutta in India. After studying at Dover College and Crystal Palace School of Practical Engineering, he was articled to D. Gravell between 1909 and 1912 before joining the South Eastern and Chatham Railway.

During World War I, he served with London Scottish as a non-commissioned officer before being commissioned in the Royal Engineers as a temporary second lieutenant on 15 October 1915. He served with the British Expeditionary Force (BEF) in France between 1915 and 1919. Robertson received promotion to the rank of lieutenant on 4 October 1916 and was appointed adjutant on 30 October. He was appointed to the acting rank of captain on 10 November 1916 and by 1 October 1918 was an acting major (at which point he received the temporary rank of captain). Robertson retired from the army on 4 May 1919, being promoted at the same time to the temporary rank of major.

During the war Robertson was mentioned twice in dispatches and received the Military Cross and bar. He was awarded the Military Cross on 26 September 1917 for personally visiting, during heavy artillery and gas bombardment, a number of bridges to report upon their condition. He was badly affected by the gas but completed the task and afterwards ensured that supplies were carried up for the repair of the structures. The bar was awarded 8 March 1919 for actions taken 22–25 October 1918. During the Hundred Days Offensive he successfully erected five bridges over a canal and several streams at Nivelle, whilst under German machine gun and artillery fire.

== Civilian career ==
After the First World War he held numerous positions in the railway industry, including positions with Great Eastern and London and North Eastern Railways, before becoming Chief Civil Engineer (1938–40) and then Engineer-in-Chief (1940–43) to the London Passenger Transport Board. He was appointed a Commander of the Order of the British Empire in the 1943 Birthday Honours for his contribution to London transport during the Second World War. In 1944 he became Chief Civil Engineer to the Southern Railway Company, and the Southern Region of British Railways post-nationalisation, until his retirement in 1951. Subsequently, he was a partner and then consultant to Sir William Halcrow and Partners until 1964.

Robertson had become a member of the Institution of Civil Engineers in 1919, was elected a fellow in 1930 and served as president for the November 1949 to November 1950 session. He was also a fellow and president of the Permanent Way Institution, vice-president of the Institution of Transport, a member of the Institution of Mechanical Engineers and the Institution of Electrical Engineers, an honorary fellow of the Society of Engineers and an honorary member of the American Railway Engineering Association. Additionally, he was a member and in 1957 president of the Smeatonian Society of Civil Engineers.

== Second World War military service ==
Robertson had been appointed to the Supplementary Reserve as a major on 19 November 1924 and ceased to belong to that unit exactly four years later. His military career was revived on 26 February 1938 when he was appointed a lieutenant-colonel in the Engineer and Railway Staff Corps, a voluntary part-time unit supporting the British Army. He was promoted to colonel on 8 May 1940 and later served as commanding officer of the unit, until 1 January 1956.

Professional and academic associations
Preceded by Jonathan Davidson	President of the Institution of Civil Engineers; November 1949 – November 1950	Succeeded by William Glanville
Military offices
Unknown	Officer Commanding, Engineer and Railway Staff Corps; Until 1956	Succeeded by Col. Sir John Elliot
