= John Wykeham Jacomb-Hood =

British railway engineer (1859–1914)

Major John Wykeham Jacomb-Hood FPWI MICE MIEE
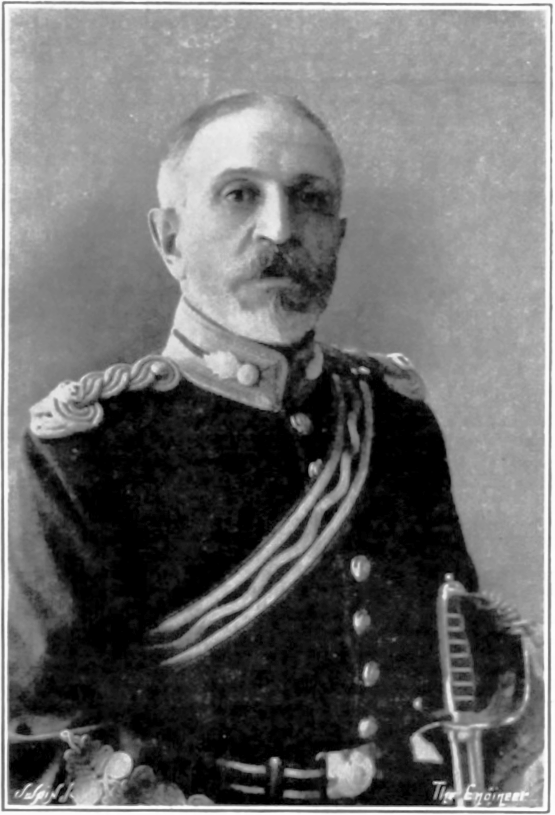
- A photograph of Jacomb-Hood published alongside his obituary
- Born: 12 January 1859; Lewisham, Kent (Note: Lewisham was in the historic county of Kent until 1889, when it became a part of London.)
- Died: 6 March 1914 (aged 55); Hawkridge Common near Hawkridge, Somerset
- Known for: Chief Resident Engineer of the London and South Western Railway
- Relatives: Robert Jacomb-Hood (father); George Percy Jacomb-Hood (brother)

John Wykeham Jacomb-Hood (Note: His family name has sometimes been left unhyphenated as Jacomb Hood.) (12 January 1859 – 6 March 1914) was a British railway engineer most notable for his role as the chief engineer, and then chief resident engineer, of the London and South Western Railway (LSWR), a position he held between 1901 and his death from heart failure in 1914. During this time he undertook the rebuilding of Clapham Junction railway station as well as various railway bridges. His most notable work was the design and construction of the roof and platforms at London Waterloo railway station, a project which outlived him.

The son of Robert Jacomb-Hood, himself a successful railway engineer, Jacomb-Hood began his career working under his cousin, and father's former pupil, William Jacomb, who was the Chief Engineer of the LSWR; he would stay at the company his entire life. He held junior positions until 1887 when he was promoted to a District Engineer, first of the London region and then of the Western region. As well as his main occupation at the LSWR he was a Major in the Engineer and Railway Staff Corps, a president of the Permanent Way Institution, and a member of the American Society of Civil Engineers.

== Early life and education ==
Jacomb-Hood was born in Lewisham on 12 January 1859, the second son of his parents. His father was Robert Jacomb-Hood, himself a prominent railway engineer and the Resident Engineer and later a director of the London, Brighton and South Coast Railway. His mother was Jane Jacomb-Hood (née Littlewood), and his parents had married on 25 November 1851. His mother died in 1869 and his father in 1900.

His grandfather, born Robert Jacomb, had inherited an estate at Bardon Hall from a cousin, and changed his surname to "Jacomb-Hood" as a condition of the inheritance. His father sold the estate on 13 June 1864 when he was aged 5. He was educated at Tonbridge School in 1872–75 alongside his elder brother George Percy Jacomb-Hood and then at the Crystal Palace Engineering School. In 1895 he was recorded, alongside his brother, as a member of the Old Tonbridgian Society.

== Career ==
=== 1877–1900: Early career ===
His career began in 1877 when he was sent to work for William Jacomb, the Chief Engineer to the London and South Western Railway (LSWR), where he would work for the rest of his life. William Jacomb had been a pupil of Jacomb-Hood's father, and then formed a partnership with him under the name 'Jacomb and Hood', which was dissolved by mutual consent when Jacomb took up his role as chief engineer in 1869.

Between 1880 and 1883 he was sent to work in the Central District under the supervision of the District Engineer. In the company records, his first actual employment by the LSWR was in December 1882; he had been recommended for a job by William Jacomb. On 2 December 1884, Jacomb-Hood was elected an associate member to the Institution of Civil Engineers. He was first sent to work on the construction of the Fullerton to Hurstbourne Line between 1883 and 1885, with a salary of £250, equivalent to £26,000 in 2025. Other projects he was responsible for in this time period were widening the South West Main Line from its terminus at London Waterloo to Nine Elms and then from near Surbiton railway station to Woking railway station.

After completing those works, he was sent to engineer the Southampton–Fareham line between Netley and Fareham in 1886. However, he was taken away from this in June 1888 in order to be promoted to the District Engineer of the London District of the LSWR. By this time he had also worked on the Budleigh Salterton Railway, the central railway bridge in Southampton, the widening of the line between Clapham Junction and Surbiton railway station, and the replacement of the Redbridge Viaduct over the River Test. His initial salary as District Engineer was £350, equivalent to £39,300 in 2025.

On 27 January 1891 he was elected a Member of the Institution of Civil Engineers (MICE). In February 1897 he then saw further promotion to District Engineer of the Western District, with his offices based in Exeter, where his address had been recorded as 39 Longbrook Street in 1891. By the time he was promoted to this role, his salary was £600, equivalent to £67,400 in 2025. In 1900, under the role of 'signal engineer' for the LSWR, he visited the United States to research different forms of signalling. He took particular interest in the low-pressure pneumatic system, which replaced the signal levers with pull-out slides, thus reducing the physical effort of signalling while involving simpler installation and maintenance than electric equivalents. Jacomb-Hood had a test box installed at Grateley railway station in Hampshire, and by 1903 the technology had been expanded northwards on the South West Main Line to Andover.

=== 1901–1914: Tenure as Chief Engineer ===
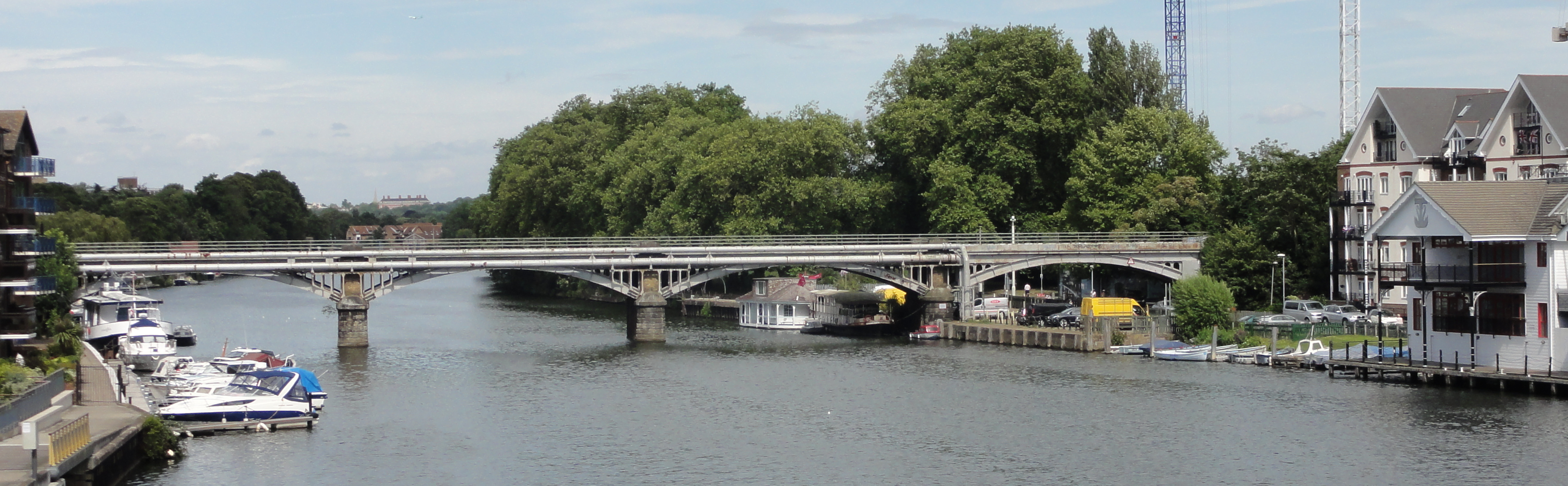
Kingston Railway Bridge

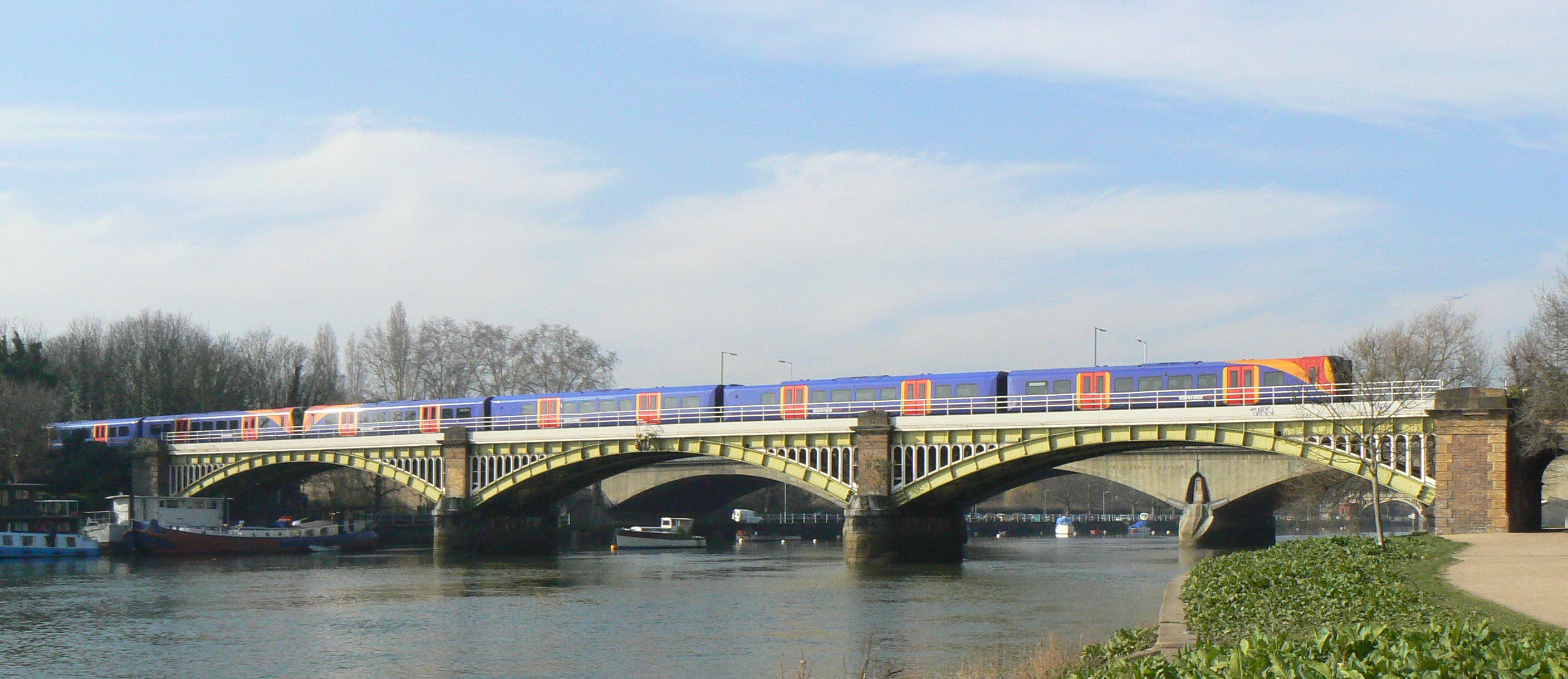
Richmond Railway Bridge

On 1 March 1901, he became the Chief Engineer of the LSWR, succeeding Edmund Andrews, who himself had succeeded William Jacomb in 1887; his offices were at London Waterloo railway station. In his tenure as chief engineer, Jacomb-Hood was responsible for the rebuilding of Clapham Junction railway station, Salisbury railway station, and Basingstoke railway station. His initial salary as Chief Engineer was £1000 (£106,300 in 2025), which then reached £1500 in 1903 (£157,700 in 2025). In 1901, he was tasked by the company to write a report on its finances, in which he identified £652,195 of works to continue, £298,500 to finish as soon as it was convenient to do so, and £168,717 to stop immediately. However, most works were continued in spite of these recommendations.

In 1902, Jacomb-Hood co-wrote a paper for the London and South Western Railway Debating Society which argued for electrification of not only the main line, but also suburban routes. Then, in 1903, he wrote the paper High-Speed Electric Traction on Railways, in which he set out how to go about designing electrification schemes for mainlines. His recommendations included permitting continual speeds of more than 60 miles per hour (97 km/h), ensuring electric traction was cheaper to operate per tonne-mile, and the electrification being compatible with stopping services, express services, and freight trains. The LSWR were able to afford his suggestions for electrification but chose to pursue other ventures, such as the purchase of the Waterloo and City Railway, now the Waterloo & City line of the London Underground. The same year, he introduced a new system of track maintenance to improve the efficiency of the engineering department; this involved using different materials for the permanent way depending on the number of trains using the line. From 1 January 1905, his job title was changed from "Chief Engineer" to "Chief Resident Engineer" of the company.

Jacomb-Hood was also responsible for the rebuilding of both the Richmond Railway Bridge and Kingston Railway Bridge over the River Thames, which were completed in 1907 and 1908 respectively. In 1909 his salary was once again raised, this time to £1800, equivalent to £185,200 in 2025. He was also responsible for the LSWR's introduction of precast concrete blocks—in a similar fashion to Lego—for many types of infrastructure, including stations, footbridges, and signal boxes. The first use of this was at Exmouth Yard in 1913. While this method of construction was not necessarily as pretty as its predecessors, it was a significantly more efficient and practical method of construction, and it contributed to the overall image of the Southern Railway. The Concrete Society mentioned this as one of the possible first uses of precast concrete in the United Kingdom. From 1907–1910, he sat on the council of the Institution of Electrical Engineers. The final time his salary was raised before his death was in January 1912, when it was increased to £2000, equivalent to £197,500 in 2025.

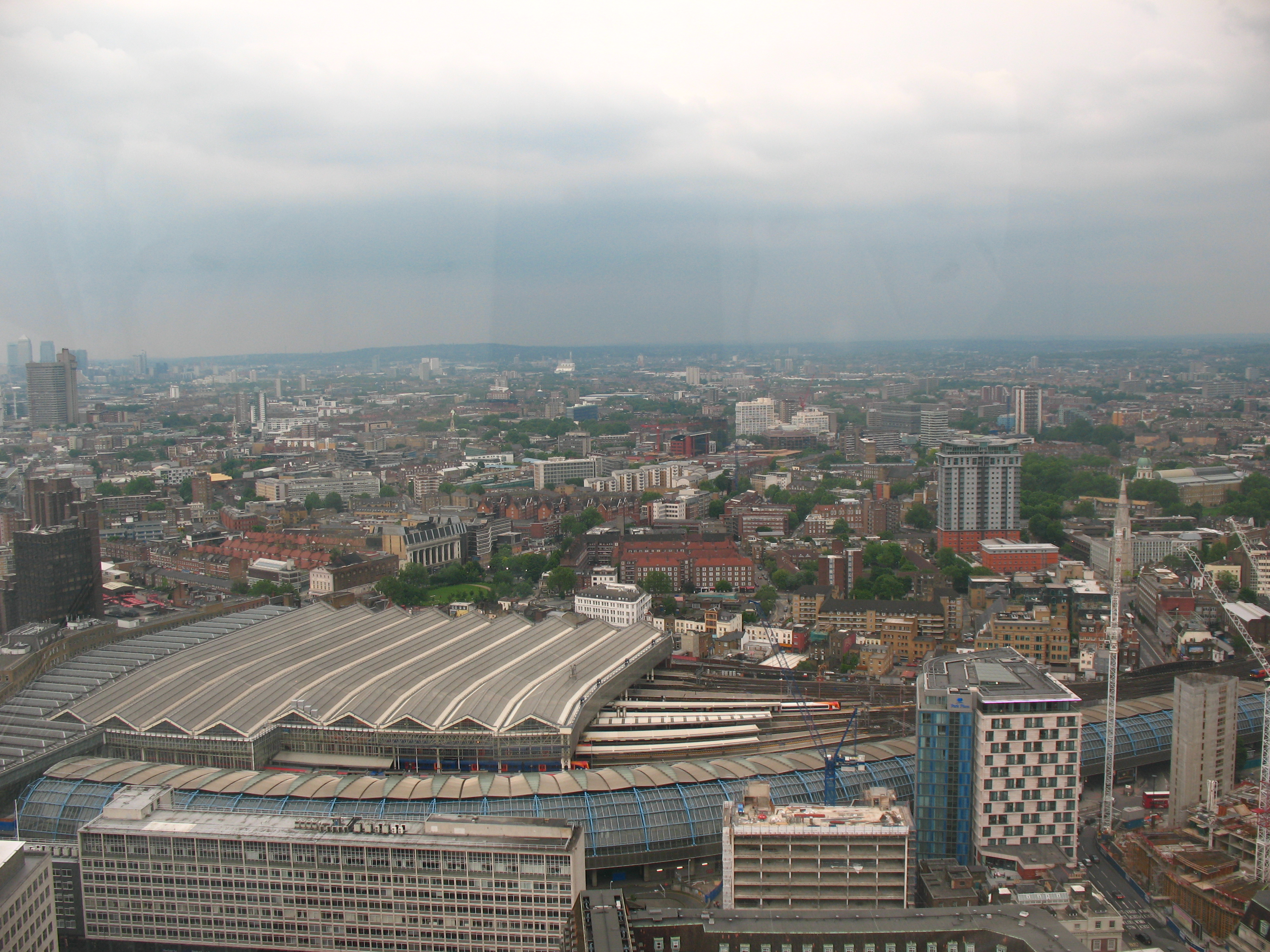
London Waterloo railway station in the foreground; the roof pieces parallel to the camera and the platforms below were Jacomb-Hood's work, in front are the international platforms.

The LSWR had originally gained permission in 1899–1900 to rebuild and expand their terminus at London Waterloo railway station. After Jacomb-Hood became Chief Engineer, he became responsible for the works, described in his 1914 obituary as his most important, and was sent to the United States to look at their terminus stations for inspiration. Jacomb-Hood presented a design of 23 platforms, a large concourse, and a glass and steel roof for the trainshed which was designed to run perpendicular to the platforms. However, one section of old roof was kept and thus the final station had two fewer platforms. The decorative façade and offices of the main station were designed by J.R. Scott, whose architecture contrasted with the practical nature of Jacomb-Hood's design for the layout. Construction was partially complete by 1909, with the booking hall opening on 11 June 1911 and road access on 18 December. Following his death, the ongoing work to finish the station was taken over by Alfred Weeks Szlumper, who had succeeded Jacomb-Hood as Chief Engineer of the LSWR.

Other roles Jacomb-Hood held in his career were membership of the American Society of Civil Engineers, and presidency of the Permanent Way Institution for 1911. He was also a Major in the Engineer and Railway Staff Corps; various railway companies' engineers acted as volunteers in the corps, which allowed them to stay civilians, and their role was to ensure the utility of the railway system in the case of war. He was also a member of the Church Union and the chairman of the branch for Kingston and Surbiton in South London. He was also a member of the Executive Council of the Devon Beekeepers' Association, to which he gave talks on apiculture. Dr David Turner argued in his PhD thesis that Jacomb-Hood's tenure as a senior manager at the LSWR was markedly different than that of others who had risen through the ranks of the company, because he made a genuine attempt to improve its practices and financial efficiency.

== Personal life ==
On 28 April 1886 he married Mary Elizabeth Footner at St Mary's Church in Andover, Hampshire. His profession was recorded as Line Engineer, and his address at 112 Lexham Gardens, Kensington, which at the time was in Middlesex. In October–December 1892 he had a child named Mary Deane Jacomb-Hood; as of the 1911 census, the last before his death, he had had no other children, and was living with his wife and 18-year-old daughter at 27 Denmark Avenue, Wimbledon, London. On 6 March 1914, he went out riding to meet the fox hunters in Dulverton, but was found dead on Hawkridge Common; he was aged 55, and his death was attributed to heart failure. At the time of his death, his official address was 31 Marloes Road, Kensington, Middlesex. In his will, he left all of his money to his widow Mary; this totalled £1050 16s. 9d., which is worth £104,800 in 2025.

== See also ==
- Jacomb-Hood
