= Trumpeters' House =

Building in Richmond, London

Coordinates: 51.4607°N 0.3096°W

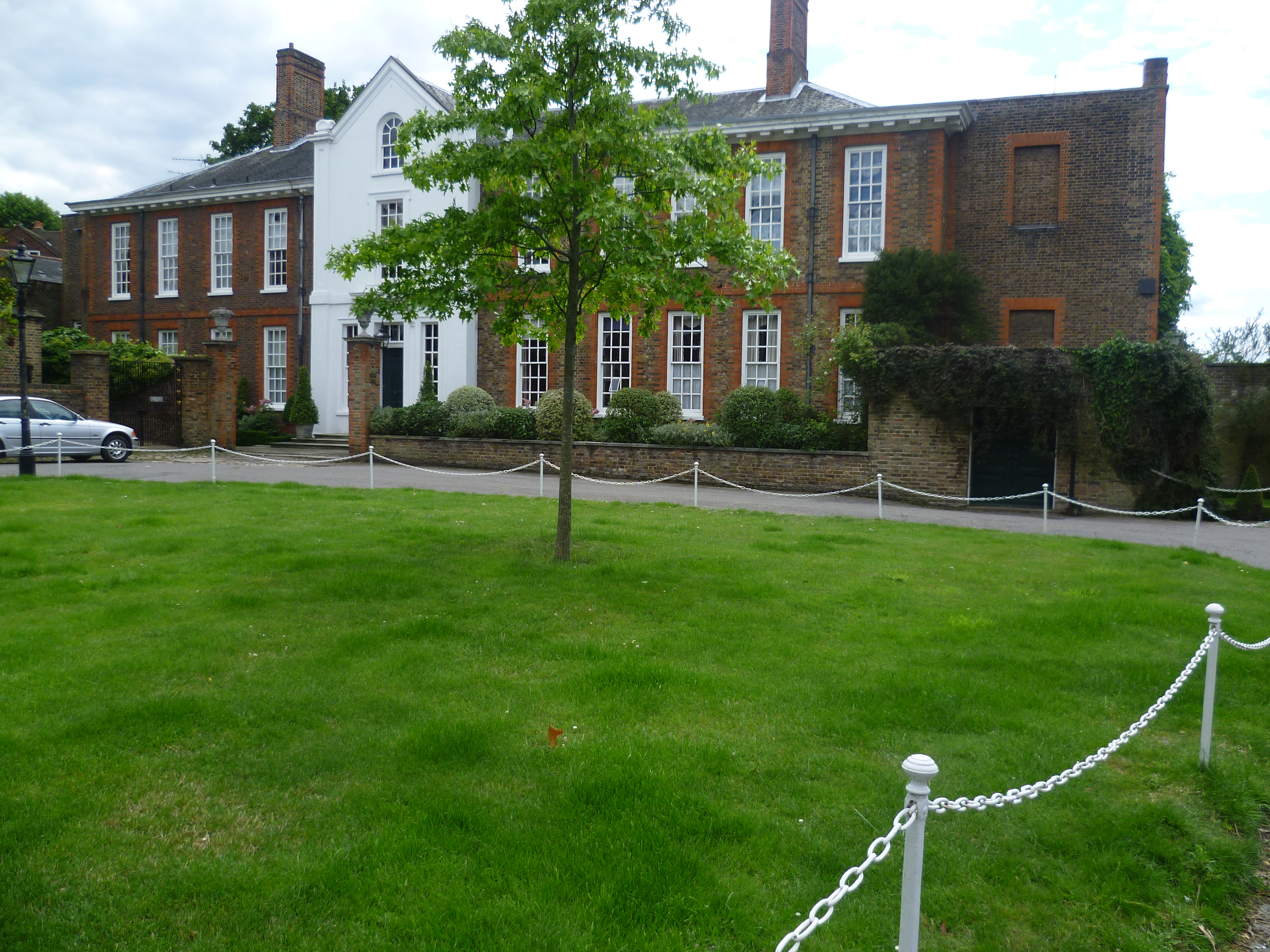
Front of the house from Old Palace Yard

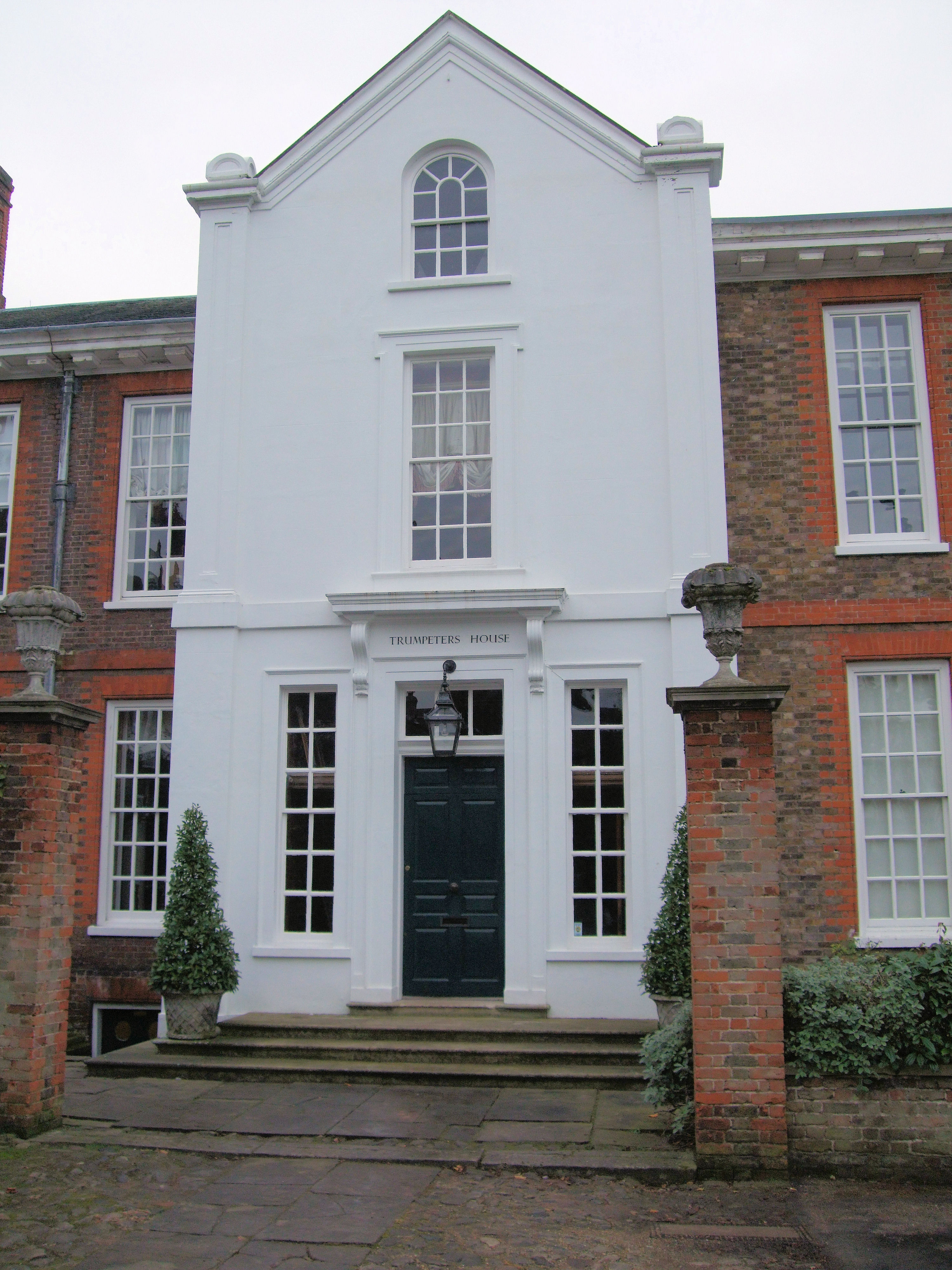
Close-up of the entrance to the stucco house

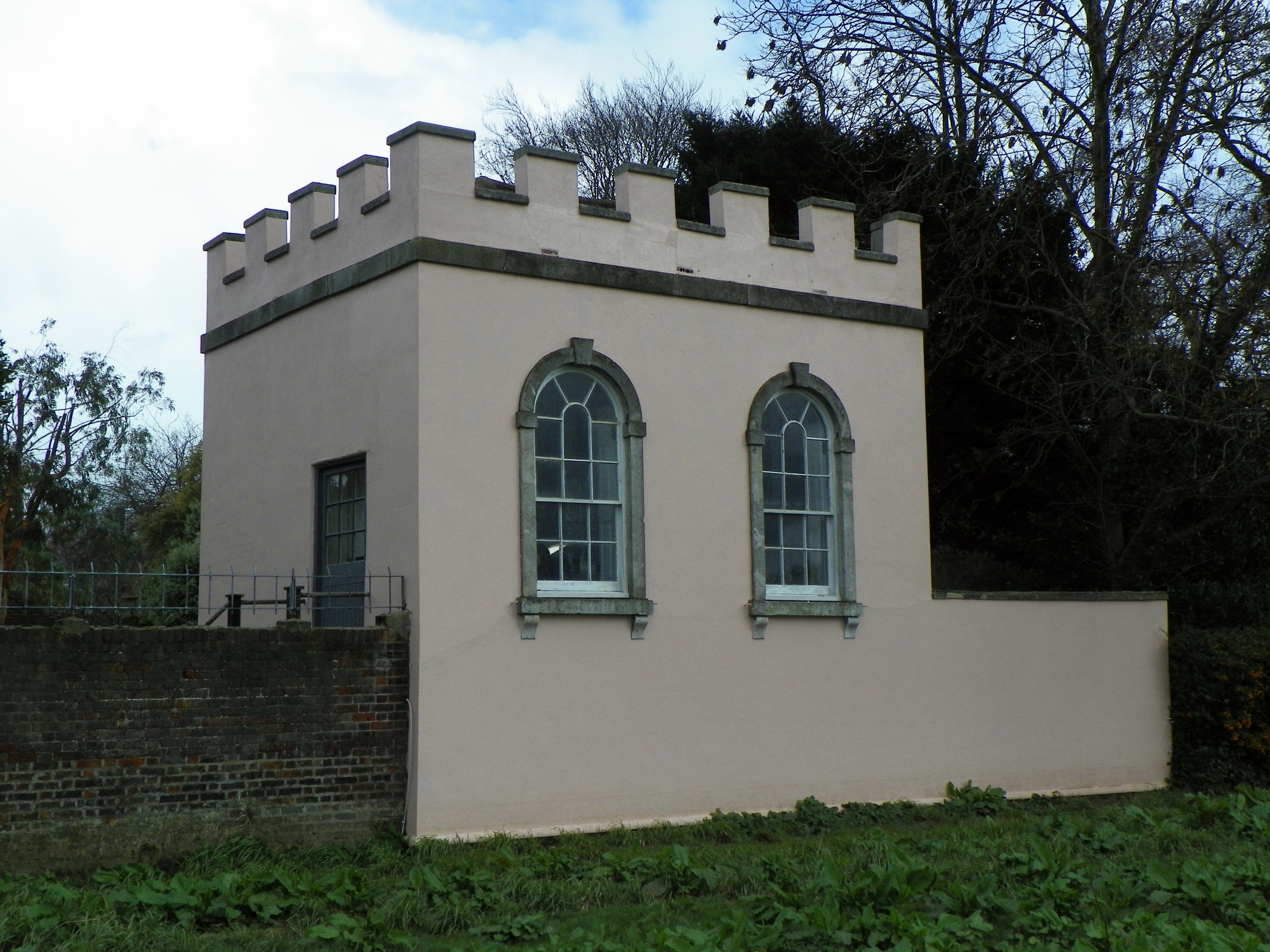
The gazebo in the house's gardens

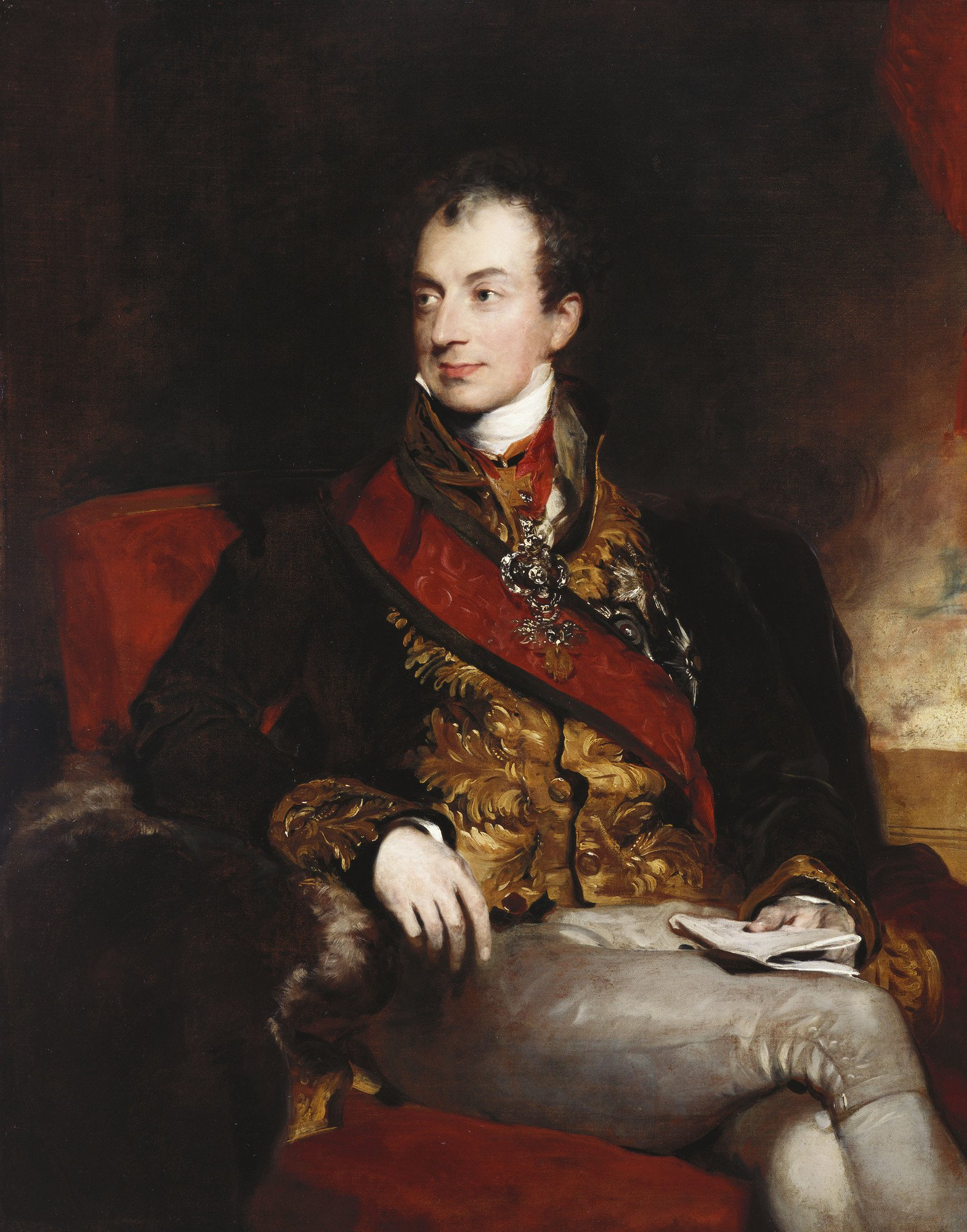
Portrait of Prince Metternich by Thomas Lawrence. Metternich stayed at the house in 1848–49.

Trumpeters' House is a Grade I listed building in Richmond in south-west London. It is located in Old Palace Yard close to Richmond Green on the site of the former Richmond Palace. A brick mansion, it was constructed during the reign of Queen Anne during the early eighteenth century.

Sheen Palace had existed since the Middle Ages. Henry VII had rebuilt this old site as a new Thames-side palace during the early Tudor period and renamed it Richmond Palace. It gradually fell into disuse over the following centuries. In the early eighteenth century the former middle gate of the palace was demolished and the house erected in its place around 1708. It was known as the Trumpeters' House due to the figures of the two trumpeters that had featured on the gate. The new property was designed for the soldier John Hill, the brother of Queen Anne's favourite Abigail Hill. From 1765 the Old Richmond Theatre was located nearby.

In 1848 the Austrian statesman Klemens von Metternich resided at the house after going into exile following the Revolutions of 1848 that shook Continental Europe that year. After visiting Metternich there, future British Prime Minister Benjamin Disraeli described it as "on Richmond Green the most charming house in the world". It was later lived in by the radio-frequency engineer, inventor and politician Guglielmo Marconi. During the Second World War Trumpeters' House housed an American Red Cross club, hosted by Lady Doverdale, the former Australian actress Audrey Pointing. The house was badly damaged by an enemy bomb in August 1944.

Since the late 1990s it has been the home of Baron Willem van Dedem (1929–2015), a Dutch businessman, art collector, art historian and philanthropist, and his wife Ronny. The gardens are open for private events.

It has been a Grade I listed building since 1950. A gazebo at the far end of the gardens by the towpath of the Thames was constructed in the mid-eighteenth century and is itself Grade II listed.

== Sources ==
- Cherry, Bridget; Pevsner, Nikolaus (2002). The Buildings of England. London 2: South. London: Yale University Press. ISBN 978-0-300096514.
- Cloake, John (2001). Cottages and Common Fields of Richmond and Kew: Studies in the Economic and Social History of the Manor of Richmond Up to the Mid-nineteenth Century. London: Phillimore. ISBN 978-1-860771958.
- Fowler, Simon (2026). Richmond at War 1939–1945 (second ed.). London: Richmond Local History Society. ISBN 978-1-9123140-6-5.
- Lees-Milne, James (1970). English Country Houses: Baroque, 1685–1715. Country Life Books. ISBN 978-1-851490431.
- Raboy, Marc (2016). Marconi: The Man Who Networked the World. Oxford University Press. ISBN 978-0-199313587.
