= Jacomb =

Jacomb and Jacombs are surnames, and may refer to:

- Agnes E. Jacomb (1866–1949), English novelist
- Albert E. Jacomb (c. 1873–1946), British printer and founding member of the Socialist Party of Great Britain
- John Jacomb (1841–1891), Australian cricketer
- Josephine Jacombs, known as Rosa Bird (1866–1927), Australian-English soprano
- Martin Jacomb (1929–2024), British barrister and businessman
- Robert Jacomb (1680–1732), English financier and politician
- Thomas Jacomb (1622–1687), ejected English minister
- Josh Jacomb (born 2001), New Zealand rugby player
