= Railway Engineering Institution =

British professional institution for railway engineering

- Abbreviation: RailEI
- Formation: 5 January 1884; 142 years ago
- Type: Railway engineering professional association
- Professional title: Chartered Railway Engineer
- Region served: Worldwide
- Fields: Railway infrastructure and systems engineering and operation
- Members: 250 Fellows; 3,300 Members; 4,500 all affiliates (as of December 2024)
- President: Chrisma Jain
- Chief Executive Officer: Stephen Barber
- Website: www.railei.org

The Railway Engineering Institution (RailEI), formerly the Permanent Way Institution (PWI), is a professional engineering institution focused on railway infrastructure and rail systems engineering. Founded in the United Kingdom in 1884, it supports the development, sharing and application of technical knowledge across railway engineering disciplines.

Originally established to advance permanent way, or track, engineering, the Institution has broadened over time to reflect the multi-disciplinary nature of modern railway engineering. Its activities now cover areas including track, drainage, and civil engineering, electrification, plant, asset management and systems integration.

In 2026, the change from PWI to RailEI was made to reflect the broader scope and to move away from a name associated primarily with track engineering and to represent the wider rail engineering profession.

== History ==
=== Foundation and Early Development ===
The Permanent Way Institution (PWI) was established by William Lewis Meredith in 1884 as the Institution of Permanent Way Inspectors, during a period of rapid railway expansion. Its original purpose was to provide a forum for engineers responsible for the design, construction, and maintenance of railway track (the "permanent way") to exchange technical knowledge and improve engineering practice, and was subsequently renamed the Permanent Way Institution in 1895.

=== Expansion and Broadening Scope ===
Over the course of the 20th century, the Institution evolved alongside changes in railway technology and operations. As rail systems became more complex, its scope extended beyond track engineering to include structures, geotechnics and drainage, electrification, and associated infrastructure disciplines and to cater for traditional rail networks, freight and light rail operations.

The Institution's role expanded to include technical meetings, publications and regional engagement to support professional development.

=== Industry Change and Modernisation ===
With structural changes in the rail industry, including privatisation in the United Kingdom, and increasing globalisation, the Institutions focus further broadened to reflect the complex multi-disciplinary nature of modern railway engineering. The Institution now saw the growth of asset management, systems integration and the increasing role of digital technology to infrastructure delivery and maintenance, within their remit.

In 2015 the PWI obtained an affiliate licence as a Professional Engineering Institution (PEI), which became a full licence in 2019.

=== Change to the Rail Engineering Institution ===
During 2025 a motion to change the name of the institution, to the Railway Engineering Institution (RailEI), was passed following a vote by members. The change was driven to reflect the expanded scope of modern railway engineering and a shift toward a more inclusive, multi-disciplinary identity. The change recognised that the traditional focus on "permanent way" no longer fully represented the breadth of engineering disciplines required across contemporary rail systems.

== Purpose and Activities ==
=== Technical programme ===
The Institution delivers a programme of technical lectures, seminars, site visits and conferences through its UK sections and affiliated organisations, providing opportunities for the exchange of engineering knowledge and practice.

=== Publications ===
The Institution produces journals, newsletters and other technical material to support the dissemination of knowledge within the rail engineering sector. These include:

- British Railway Track
  - Premier text covering the technical aspects of railway track.
  - Focused on track engineering geometry, components and their maintenance.
- The Journal (formerly the PWI Journal)
  - Current flagship publication of the Rail Engineering Institution
  - Covers technical papers, industry developments, and member contributions
- Technical Papers and Proceedings
  - Published outputs from RailEI/PWI lectures, seminars, and conferences
  - Forms part of the Institution's formal knowledge base
- Section Newsletters (UK and International Sections)
  - Locally produced publications (e.g. PWINSW)
  - Focus on regional activities, site visits, and technical updates

=== Awards ===
The Institution recognises professional and technical achievement within the rail engineering sector through awards and related forms of recognition.

== Membership and Professional Development ==
=== Membership Grades ===
The institution is a membership organisation comprising over 4,159 members worldwide (as of 31 December 2024); around 80% are located in the United Kingdom. Membership grades include:

- Student/Graduate
- Member (MRailEI/MPWI)
- Fellow (FRailEI/FPWI)

The Railway Engineering Institution (Permanent Way Institution) is a licensed body of the Engineering Council and can award the Chartered Engineer (CEng), Incorporated Engineer (IEng) and Engineering Technician (EngTech) professional qualifications.

=== Professional development ===
The Institution supports continuing professional development through its technical programme and knowledge-sharing activities.

== Governance and Organisational Structure ==
=== Governance ===
The Rail Engineering Institution (RailEI) is governed by a Board of Directors responsible for oversight and strategic direction.

The Board includes the Institution's presidential succession, comprising the immediate past President, current President and Deputy Presidents (as future Presidents). It also includes non-executive directors and permanent appointments, including roles such as Finance Director.

=== UK sections ===
The Institution now operates through 15 regional "home sections" within the United Kingdom. These form part of the RailEI structure and deliver local technical programmes and member engagement. The number of sections has been consolidated in recent years, reducing from 27 sections in the early 1970s.

=== International sections and affiliates ===
RailEI operates internationally through a combination of sections and affiliated organisations. Historically, the PWI had included sections in India, Ireland, Nigeria, Malaysia, New Zealand, Australia, Sudan and Central Africa, however, it currently, maintains overseas sections in Ireland and India, which form part of the Institution's core structure.

Affiliated organisations still operate under the Permanent Way Institution (PWI) name in regions including Australia, the Middle East and Hong Kong. These affiliates operate independently within their local jurisdictions while remaining aligned with the Rail Engineering Institution's governance and objectives.

== Notable Members ==
The Institution has included a number of prominent railway engineers among its leadership, including the following former Presidents:

- Vernon Robertson – President of both the Permanent Way Institution and the Institution of Civil Engineers (ICE)
- Alfred W. Szlumper – President of the Permanent Way Institution (1922) and Chief Engineer of the London and South Western Railway
- John Wykeham Jacomb-Hood – President of the Permanent Way Institution (1911) and Chief Engineer of the London and South Western Railway
- Raymond Carpmael – Twice President of the Permanent Way Institution (1930-32 & 1938) and Chief Engineer of the Great Western Railway
