= John Jacomb =

Australian cricketer (1841–1891)

Personal information
- Full name: John Newton Jacomb
- Born: 3 October 1841; New Town, Van Diemen's Land
- Died: 5 November 1891 (aged 50); Walhalla, Victoria, Australia

Domestic team information
- Years: Team
- 1860/61: Victoria
- 1863/64: Otago
- Source: Cricinfo, 3 May 2015

John Newton Jacomb (3 October 1841 – 5 November 1891) was an Australian cricketer. He played one first-class cricket match for Victoria during the 1860–61 season and one match for Otago in 1863–64.

Jacomb was born at New Town, Tasmania in 1841 and educated at Scotch College in Melbourne. He worked as a hotel keeper and mined gold. He died in 1891 at Walhalla, Victoria.
