= Richmond Railway Bridge =

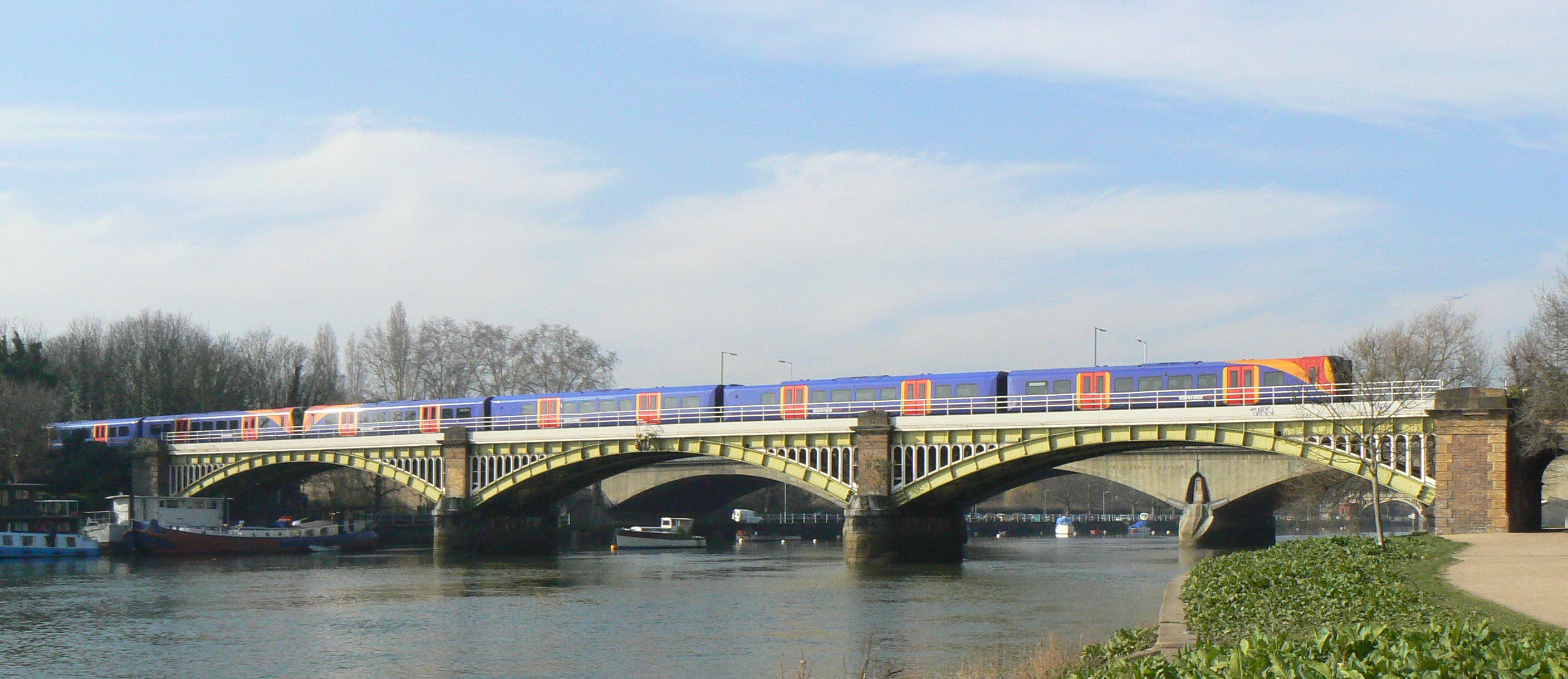
- Richmond Railway Bridge looking downstream
- Coordinates: 51°27′36″N 0°18′49″W
- Carries: National Rail services operated by South Western Railway
- Crosses: River Thames
- Locale: Richmond
- Other name(s): Richmond Windsor and Staines Railway Bridge
- Maintained by: Network Rail
- Heritage status: Grade II listed structure

Characteristics
- Design: Truss arch bridge
- Material: Steel
- Total length: 91.5 metres
- No. of spans: 3

History
- Designer: Joseph Locke (1848); John Wykeham Jacomb-Hood (1908)
- Opened: 1848; rebuilt 1908

Statistics

Listed Building – Grade II
- Official name: Richmond Railway Bridge and Approach Viaduct
- Designated: 26 November 2008
- Reference no.: 1393016

Location
- Interactive map of Richmond Railway Bridge

Richmond Railway Bridge in Richmond, Greater London, crosses the River Thames immediately upstream of Twickenham Bridge. It carries National Rail services operated by South Western Railway (SWR) on the Waterloo to Reading Line, and lies between Richmond and St Margarets stations. The bridge was amongst the first railway crossings of the Thames.

The first Richmond Railway Bridge was built by the contractor Thomas Brassey and designed by the civil engineers Joseph Locke and J. E. Errington on behalf of the London and South Western Railway (L&SWR). Opened during 1848, it was originally known as the Richmond Windsor and Staines Railway Bridge. Due to concerns over the bridge's use of cast iron in its construction, it was rebuilt during the 1900s, the principal change being the substitution of iron elements for steel counterparts. This second bridge, which heavily reused elements of the original, was designed by the L&SWR's then-chief engineer, John Wykeham Jacomb-Hood, and constructed by the Horseley Bridge Company between 1906 and 1908.

The second bridge is visually similar to the earlier structure, retaining much of its aesthetics and original features despite subsequent refurbishment and maintenance programmes, including the replacement of its decking and girders during the 1980s. Since 2008, both the bridge itself and its brick approach viaduct have been Grade II listed structures, protecting them from unsympathetic alterations.

== History ==
Shortly after the arrival of the London and South Western Railway (L&SWR) at Richmond station in 1846, ambitions to extend the line through to Windsor, facilitating a direct connection between Clapham Junction, Richmond and Waterloo, would be put into action. Prior to this, the Thames area had experienced relatively little in terms of railway development despite a nationwide boom in the industry, largely due to a prohibition that had been enacted by Parliament which prevented the construction of surface railways in central London. Having secured authorisation to proceed, the Richmond Railway Bridge over the Thames would be amongst the first railway crossings of the river to be constructed.

Responsibility for the design of this first railway bridge was assigned to the accomplished civil engineers Joseph Locke and J. E. Errington; they also worked together on a similar bridge at Barnes. Its construction was performed by the prolific contractor Thomas Brassey. This first bridge comprised three 100-foot cast iron girders, which were supported on stone-faced land arches in combination with a pair of stone-faced river piers with rounded cutwaters. In accompaniment to the bridge itself, a sizable arched brick viaduct crossing Richmond's Old Deer Park, was built for the bridge's eastern approach. This viaduct features ornamentation and decorative features, which was inserted into the design at the insistence of the Crown commissioners of the park.

While the bridge proved itself to be relatively problem-free in operation, by the start of the twentieth century, there were considerable concerns over the Richmond Railway Bridge's structural integrity, largely due to the use of cast iron in its construction. To address these concerns, railway officials decided that the bridge ought to be rebuilt in a new design, which was produced by the L&SWR's then-chief engineer, John Wykeham Jacomb-Hood. A contract to undertake the fabrication and erection of this second bridge was awarded to the Horseley Bridge Company in 1906.

The second bridge, which was completed during 1908, actually retained or reused numerous elements of the first bridge, including the existing piers and abutments. This new design was sympathetic to the original bridge's design, with the distinctive open spandrels having been intentionally reproduced via vertical dividers. Considerable attention was paid to the bridge's aesthetics, particularly in respect to the new steel girders that formed a core element of this new structure. This steel superstructure primarily comprised four shallow-arched ribs for each span, which are braced together as two pairs and are pinned towards their ends as to permit movement; as such, each track is effectively carried by a separate steel arch bridge placed side-by-side.

Further works have been performed to the structure over time. During 1984, the primary girders and decking of the bridge were entirely replaced. Despite having received multiple renewal programmes over the course of a century, the bridge is said to have retained much of the appearance of the original 1848 structure, while a significant proportion of historic fabric has also survived through to the present day.

Both the Richmond Railway Bridge itself and its adjacent approach viaduct were declared to be a Grade II listed structure in 2008. This status is intended to protect the structure from any unsympathetic developments with the aim of preserving its special character.

== Gallery ==
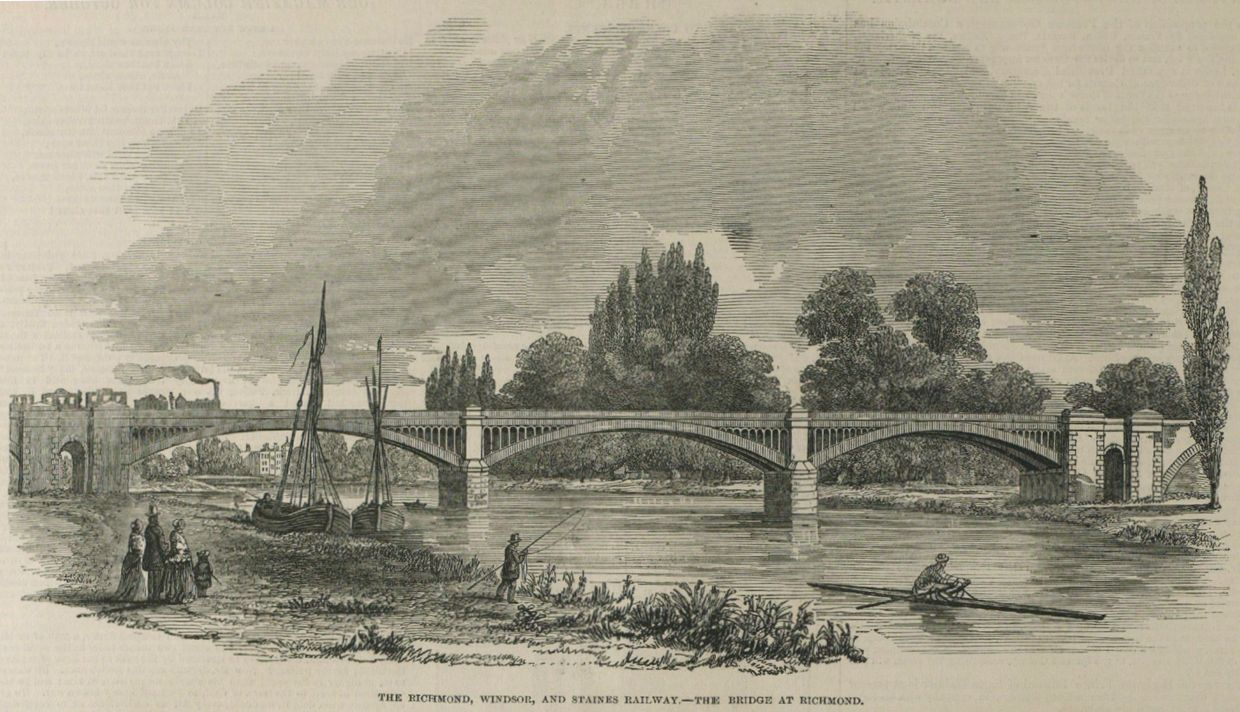
Richmond Railway Bridge, Illustrated London News, 21 October 1848

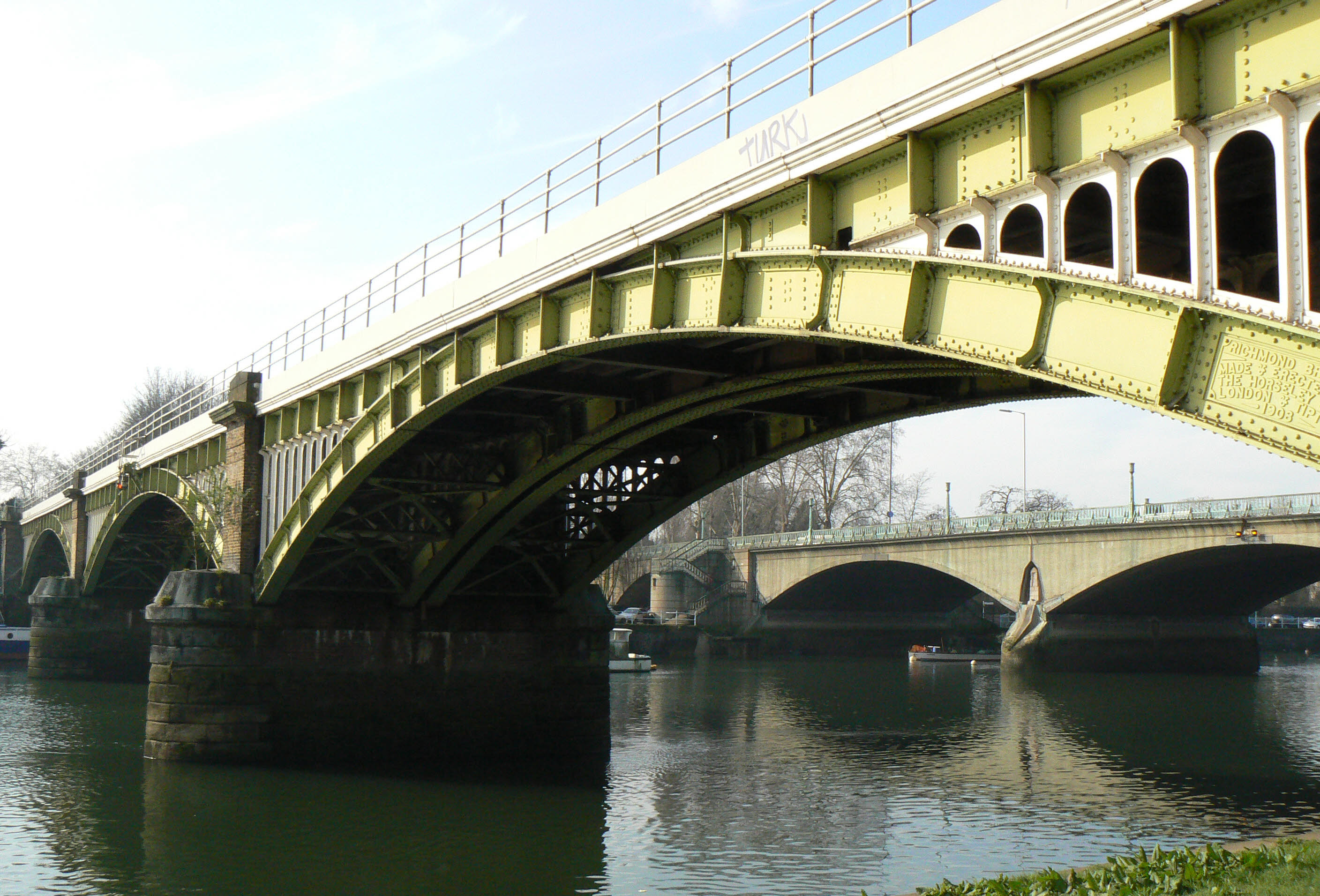
Richmond Railway Bridge looking downstream with Twickenham Bridge in the background

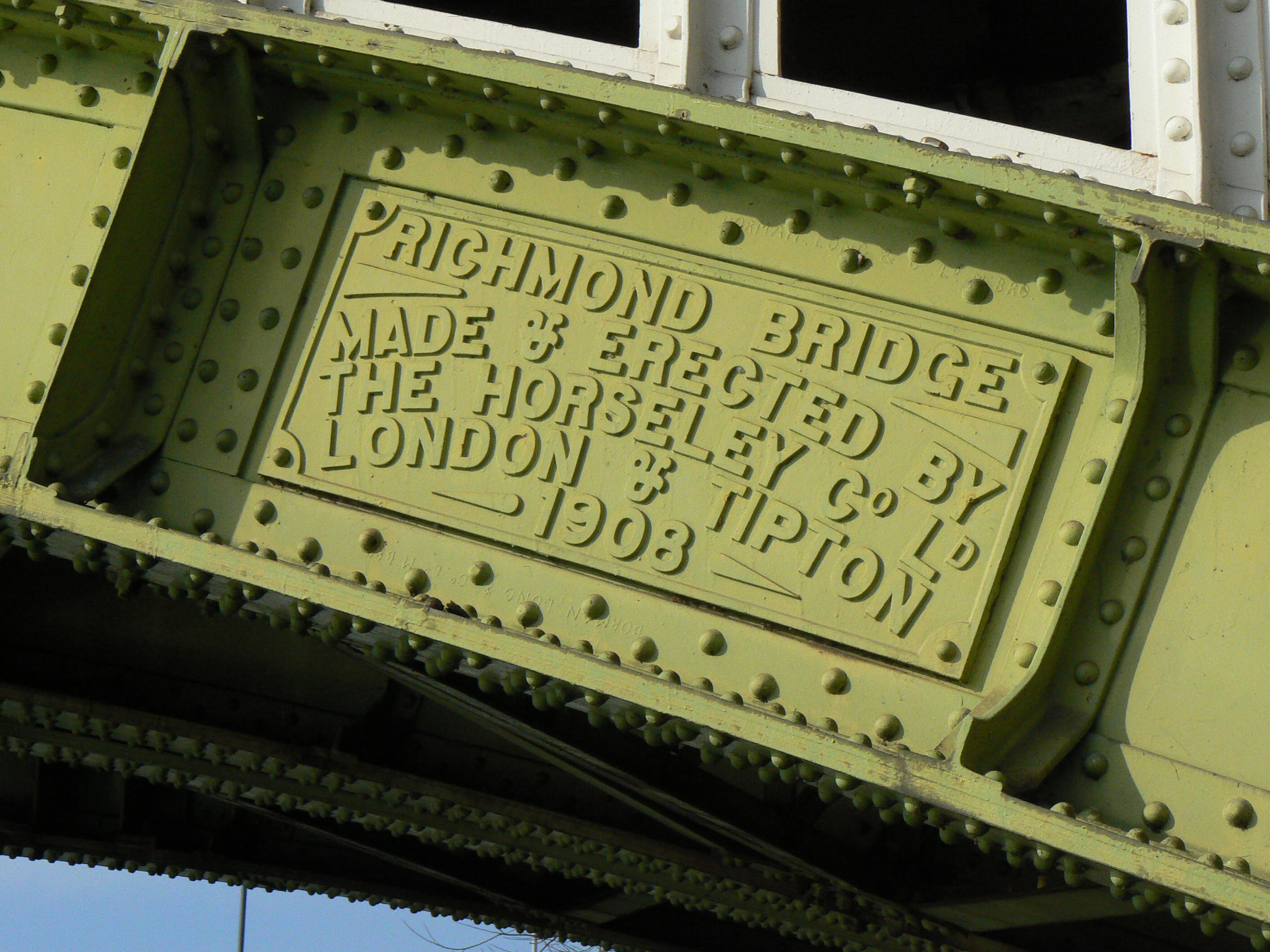
Richmond Railway Bridge manufacturer's plaque

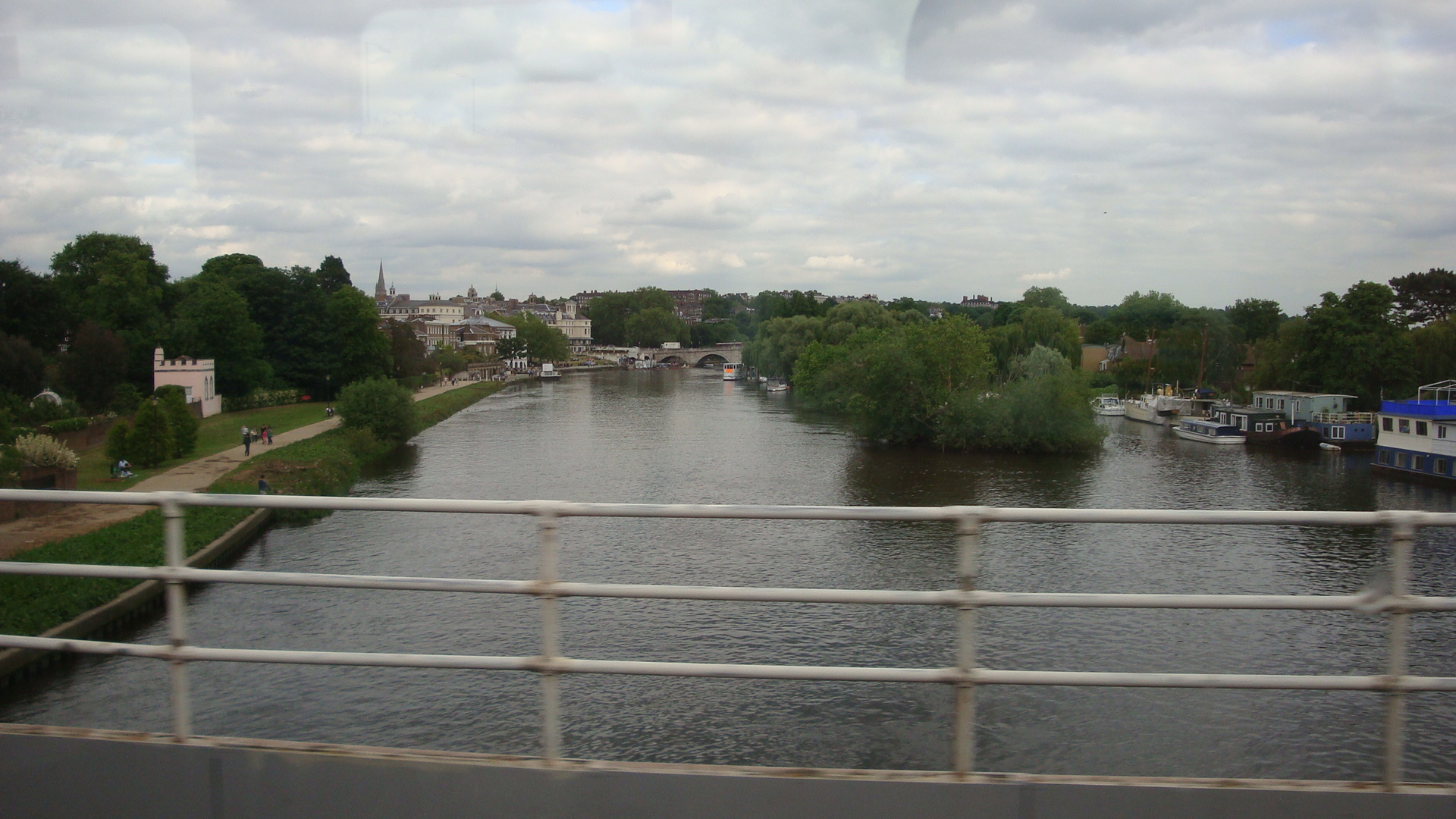
The Thames as seen from Richmond Railway Bridge

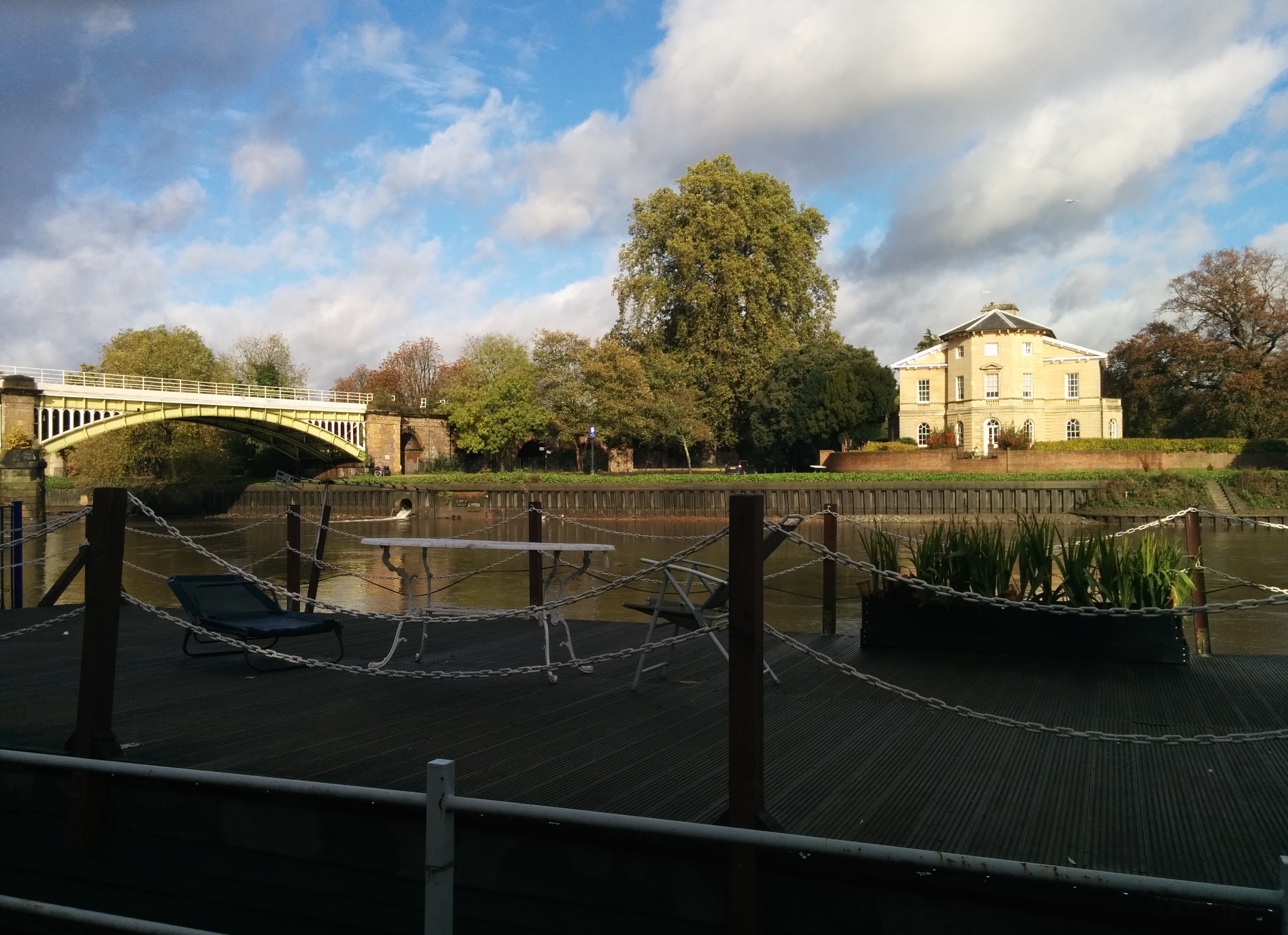
Riverside picture including the Richmond Railway Bridge and Asgill House

== See also ==
- Crossings of the River Thames
- List of bridges in London
- Old Deer Park
