= Grade II* listed buildings in the London Borough of Richmond upon Thames =

There are over 20,000 Grade II* listed buildings in England. This is a list of these buildings in the London Borough of Richmond upon Thames.

== Almshouses ==
Name	Location	Type	Completed (Note: The date given is the date used by Historic England as significant for the initial building or that of an important part in the structure's description.)	Date designated	Grid ref. (Note: The grid reference is based on the British national grid reference system, sometimes known as OSGB36, used by the Ordnance Survey.) Geo-coordinates	Entry number (Note: The "List Entry Number" is a unique number assigned to each listed building and scheduled monument by Historic England.)	Image
Hickeys Almshouses, Including Chapel and Lodges	Sheen Road, Richmond TW9 1XB	Almshouses, chapel and lodges	1834	10 January 1950	TQ1886375104; 51°27′45″N 0°17′25″W	1262108	Hickeys Almshouses, Including Chapel and Lodges More images
Houblon's Almshouses	Worple Way, Richmond TW10 6DA	Almshouses	1757–58	10 January 1950	TQ1840674978; 51°27′41″N 0°17′49″W	1253033	Houblon's Almshouses More images

== Bridges ==
Name	Location	Type	Completed	Date designated	Grid ref. Geo-coordinates	Entry number	Image
Hammersmith Bridge	Castelnau	Suspension bridge	1884	25 June 1983	TQ2293878036; 51°29′17″N 0°13′51″W	1080793	Hammersmith Bridge More images
Kingston Bridge	A308, Richmond KT1 4DP	Road bridge	1825–28	2 September 1952	TQ1769069379; 51°24′40″N 0°18′33″W	1065378	Kingston Bridge More images
Richmond Footbridge, Lock and Sluices	Richmond	Footbridge and lock	1891	25 May 1983	TQ1701575056; 51°27′45″N 0°19′01″W	1250044	Richmond Footbridge, Lock and Sluices More images
Twickenham Bridge and Attached Railings, Lamp Standards and Light Brackets	A316, Richmond TW1 1QX	Road bridge	1933	25 May 1983	TQ1721274846; 51°27′38″N 0°18′51″W	1253011	Twickenham Bridge and Attached Railings, Lamp Standards and Light Brackets More images

== Churches, memorials and tombs ==
Name	Location	Type	Completed	Date designated	Grid ref. Geo-coordinates	Entry number	Image
Bethlehem Chapel	Church Terrace, Richmond TW10 6SE	Nonconformist chapel	1797	24 December 1968	TQ1793774712; 51°27′33″N 0°18′14″W	1358048	Bethlehem Chapel More images
The Kilmorey Mausoleum (including Enclosure Wall, Railings and Gate)	275, St Margaret's Road, Twickenham TW1 1PN	Mausoleum, wall, railings and gate	1854	6 October 1989	TQ1660974904; 51°27′40″N 0°19′22″W	1240128	The Kilmorey Mausoleum (including Enclosure Wall, Railings and Gate) More images
The Lancaster Monument, East Sheen Cemetery	Sheen Road, Richmond TW10 5BJ	Statue	1920–22	5 March 1992	TQ1928174762; 51°27′33″N 0°17′04″W	1239967	The Lancaster Monument, East Sheen Cemetery More images
Mausoleum of Sir Richard and Lady Burton, Churchyard of St Mary Magdalen	61 North Worple Way, Mortlake, London SW14 8PR	Mausoleum	c. 1890	30 October 1973	TQ2086075792; 51°28′06″N 0°15′41″W	1065392	Mausoleum of Sir Richard and Lady Burton, Churchyard of St Mary Magdalen More images
St Alban	Ferry Road, Teddington TW11 9NN	Church	1886	2 September 1952	TQ1658671236; 51°25′41″N 0°19′28″W	1080819	St Alban More images
St Anne	Kew Green, Kew, Richmond TW9 3AA	Parish church	1714	10 January 1950	TQ1898277484; 51°29′02″N 0°17′16″W	1194022	St Anne More images
Churchyard of Church of St Anne, to East of Church (Tomb of Johan Zoffany)	Kew Green, Kew, Richmond TW9 3AA	Table tomb	1816	25 June 1983	TQ1901177489; 51°29′02″N 0°17′15″W	1357735	Churchyard of Church of St Anne, to East of Church (Tomb of Johan Zoffany) More images
Churchyard of Church of St Anne, to South of Church (Tomb of Thomas Gainsborough)	Kew Green, Kew, Richmond TW9 3AA	Tombstone	1788	25 June 1983	TQ1898377472; 51°29′01″N 0°17′16″W	1065407	Churchyard of Church of St Anne, to South of Church (Tomb of Thomas Gainsborough) More images
St Mary, Barnes	Church Road, Barnes, London SW13 9HL	Parish church	13th century	25 October 1951	TQ2220276583; 51°28′30″N 0°14′31″W	1358083	St Mary, Barnes More images
St Mary the Virgin Mortlake	Mortlake High Street, London SW14 8JA	Parish church	1348	25 October 1951	TQ2084575941; 51°28′10″N 0°15′42″W	1357705	St Mary the Virgin Mortlake More images
St Mary Magdalene, Richmond	Church Walk, Richmond TW9 1SN	Church	Perpendicular	10 January 1950	TQ1793474829; 51°27′37″N 0°18′14″W	1180602	St Mary Magdalene, Richmond More images
St Mary, Teddington	Ferry Road, Teddington TW11 9NN	Church	16th century onwards	2 September 1952	TQ1652271278; 51°25′43″N 0°19′31″W	1253013	St Mary, Teddington More images
St Mary, Twickenham	Church Street, Twickenham TW1 3NJ	Church	1714–15	2 September 1952	TQ1648973328; 51°26′49″N 0°19′30″W	1080852	St Mary, Twickenham More images
St Peter	Church Lane, off Petersham Road, Petersham TW10 7AB	Parish church	1505	10 January 1950	TQ1814573338; 51°26′48″N 0°18′05″W	1065334	St Peter More images
Twickenham War Memorial	Radnor Gardens, Cross Deep, Twickenham, London, TW1 4QG	War memorial	1921	5 April 2017	TQ1604572566; 51°26′25″N 0°19′54″W	1445040	Twickenham War Memorial More images

== Royal Botanic Gardens, Kew ==
Name	Location	Type	Completed	Date designated	Grid ref. Geo-coordinates	Entry number	Image
Aroid House	Royal Botanic Gardens, Kew, Richmond TW9 3AE	Pavilion	Reerected	10 January 1950	TQ1866177534; 51°29′04″N 0°17′33″W	1250800	Aroid House More images
Avenue Lodge	Royal Botanic Gardens, Kew, Richmond TW9 3AE	Lodge	1866	25 May 1983	TQ1867676402; 51°28′27″N 0°17′33″W	1251933	Avenue Lodge More images
Marianne North Gallery	Royal Botanic Gardens, Kew, Richmond TW9 3AE	Art gallery	1879–1882	10 January 1950	TQ1868276431; 51°28′28″N 0°17′33″W	1251787	Marianne North Gallery More images
Principal Entrance Gates and Railings Fronting Kew Green (now known as Elizabeth Gate)	Royal Botanic Gardens, Kew, Richmond TW9 3AE	Gate	1848	25 May 1983	TQ1873877548; 51°29′04″N 0°17′29″W	1250801	Principal Entrance Gates and Railings Fronting Kew Green (now known as Elizabeth Gate) More images
The Queen's Cottage	Royal Botanic Gardens, Kew, Richmond TW9 3AE	Timber-framed house	c. 1772	10 January 1950	TQ1790776250; 51°28′23″N 0°18′14″W	1262486	The Queen's Cottage More images
Ruined Arch, Including Fragments of Masonry at the Base of the Arch	Royal Botanic Gardens, Kew, Richmond TW9 3AE	Folly	1759	25 May 1983	TQ1865476371; 51°28′26″N 0°17′35″W	1251956	Ruined Arch, Including Fragments of Masonry at the Base of the Arch More images
Herbarium Complex, Royal Botanic Gardens, Kew - Hunter House and Wings C, B and A, including the entrance gates and railings	Royal Botanic Gardens, Kew, Richmond TW9 3AE	Herbarium	various	10 January 1950	TQ1876977629; 51°29′07″N 0°17′27″W	1065399	Herbarium Complex, Royal Botanic Gardens, Kew - Hunter House and Wings C, B and A, including the entrance gates and railings More images

== Other buildings ==
Name	Location	Type	Completed	Date designated	Grid ref. Geo-coordinates	Entry number	Image
Box Cottage (The Red House)	Sudbrook Lane, Petersham, Richmond TW10 7AT	House	Late 17th/early 18th century	10 January 1950	TQ1812073024; 51°26′38″N 0°18′06″W	1252876	Upload Photo
Buckingham House Dudley House Farthingwood and Gate and Railing Norfolk House	Montpelier Row, Twickenham TW1 2NQ	Terrace	1720	2 September 1952	TQ1700473765; 51°27′03″N 0°19′03″W	1065390	Buckingham House Dudley House Farthingwood and Gate and Railing Norfolk House
Bushy House	Bushy Road, Teddington TW11 0EB	House	Early 19th century	2 September 1952	TQ1557770357; 51°25′14″N 0°20′21″W	1080870	Bushy House More images
Cross Deep and Coach House	3 Cross Deep, Twickenham TW1 1QY	House	Late 17th/early 18th century	2 September 1952	TQ1612972947; 51°26′37″N 0°19′50″W	1358068	Cross Deep and Coach House
Douglas House	Petersham Road, Petersham, Richmond TW10 7AH	House	Late 17th century	25 June 1983	TQ1787973156; 51°26′42″N 0°18′19″W	1285296	Douglas House More images
Fotheringay House and Tennyson House	Montpelier Row, Twickenham TW1 2NQ	Terrace	1720	2 September 1952	TQ1701373745; 51°27′02″N 0°19′03″W	1285639	Fotheringay House and Tennyson House More images
Fountain Garden, Statue in Front of Canal	Hampton Court	Statue	after 16th century statue	2 September 1952	TQ1600968410; 51°24′10″N 0°20′01″W	1065453	Fountain Garden, Statue in Front of Canal More images
Garden Gates and Railings Petersham House	Church Lane, Petersham, Richmond TW10 7AG	House	Late 17th century	10 January 1950	TQ1811073311; 51°26′47″N 0°18′07″W	1065336	Garden Gates and Railings Petersham House More images
Gate and Railings to Old Friars	Richmond Green	Terraced house	Late 17th century	10 January 1950	TQ1765474833; 51°27′37″N 0°18′28″W	1065315	Gate and Railings to Old Friars
Gates and Railings to Oak House	Richmond Green, Richmond TW9 1NQ	Terraced house	Mid 18th century	10 January 1950	TQ1768374820; 51°27′36″N 0°18′27″W	1065313	Gates and Railings to Oak House More images
Gordon House Maria Grey Training College	St Margarets	House	c. 1720	21 May 1973	TQ1669375276; 51°27′52″N 0°19′18″W	1240076	Gordon House Maria Grey Training College More images
Grotto in Grounds of Hampton Court House	Hampton Court Road KT8 9BS	Grotto	Completed by 1769	18 February 1976	TQ1527768984; 51°24′29″N 0°20′38″W	1253959	Upload Photo
Grotto or Shell House in the Grounds of Thames Eyot	3 Cross Deep, Twickenham TW1 1QY	Grotto	Late 18th century or early 19th century	25 June 1983	TQ1616572951; 51°26′37″N 0°19′48″W	1080812	Upload Photo
Grove House including Moorish Room	100 High Street, Hampton TW12 2ST	House	Late 17th century	2 February 1952	TQ1426769909; 51°25′00″N 0°21′29″W	1357703	Grove House including Moorish Room More images
Harrington Lodge	Sudbrook Lane, Petersham TW10 7AT	House	Late C17/Early 18th century	10 January 1950	TQ1812573009; 51°26′38″N 0°18′06″W	1252875	Upload Photo
Langham House Close, nos. 1–18	Ham Common, Ham TW10 7JE	Flats	1957–1958	22 December 1998	TQ1760771851; 51°26′00″N 0°18′34″W	1033380	Langham House Close, nos. 1–18 More images
Langham House Close, nos. 19–24	Ham Common, Ham TW10 7JE	Flats	1957–1958	23 December 1998	TQ1757871814; 51°25′59″N 0°18′36″W	1033381	Upload Photo
Langham House Close, nos. 25–30	Ham Common, Ham TW10 7JE	Flats	1957–1958	22 December 1998	TQ1754171772; 51°25′58″N 0°18′38″W	1051027	Upload Photo
Leicester House Queen Anne House Wolsey House and Gate	Montpelier Row, Twickenham	Terrace	1720	2 September 1952	TQ1699073797; 51°27′04″N 0°19′04″W	1065389	Leicester House Queen Anne House Wolsey House and Gate
Limes House and Forecourt Piers	123 Mortlake High Street, London SW14 8SN	House	c. 1720	25 October 1951	TQ2113276050; 51°28′14″N 0°15′27″W	1065428	Limes House and Forecourt Piers More images
Lissoy	Ormond Road, Richmond TW10 6TH	Terraced house	Early 18th century	10 January 1950	TQ1785374611; 51°27′30″N 0°18′18″W	1065353	Lissoy
Manor House	Ham Street, Ham TW10 7HA	House	Early to mid 18th century	10 January 1950	TQ1729072605; 51°26′25″N 0°18′50″W	1358099	Manor House More images
Montpelier House South End House Walls, Piers, Railings and Gazebo in Grounds	Twickenham	Terrace	18th century	2 September 1952	TQ1706673647; 51°26′59″N 0°19′00″W	1065391	Montpelier House South End House Walls, Piers, Railings and Gazebo in Grounds
Montrose House	186, Petersham Road, Petersham, Richmond TW10 7AD	House	Late 17th century	25 June 1983	TQ1805473255; 51°26′46″N 0°18′09″W	1065342	Montrose House More images
Newark House	9 The Vineyard, Richmond TW10 6AQ	House	Mid 18th century	10 January 1950	TQ1804474581; 51°27′28″N 0°18′08″W	1253134	Newark House
Normansfield Hospital	Kingston Road, Teddington TW11 9JH	House	1866	25 May 1983	TQ1725970177; 51°25′07″N 0°18′54″W	1065379	Normansfield Hospital More images
No. 19, 21, and 23 Kew Foot Road	Richmond TW9 2SS	Terrace	c. 1711	10 January 1950	TQ1806575452; 51°27′57″N 0°18′06″W	1065436	No. 19, 21, and 23 Kew Foot Road
No. 356 and 358 Kew Road	Richmond	House	Early/mid 18th century	10 January 1950	TQ1906177329; 51°28′57″N 0°17′12″W	1357700	No. 356 and 358 Kew Road
No. 18 King Street	Richmond TW9 1ND	Terraced house	Early 18th century	10 January 1950	TQ1769774830; 51°27′37″N 0°18′26″W	1065373	No. 18 King Street
No. 6 Ormond Road	Richmond TW10 6TH	Terraced house	Early 18th century	10 January 1950	TQ1787774627; 51°27′30″N 0°18′17″W	1065356	No. 6 Ormond Road
1, Old Palace Terrace	Richmond TW9 1NQ	Terraced house	Early 18th century	10 January 1950	TQ1769874835; 51°27′37″N 0°18′26″W	1065311	1, Old Palace Terrace More images
2 to 6 Old Palace Terrace	Richmond	Terrace	Early 18th century	10 January 1950	TQ1770974850; 51°27′37″N 0°18′25″W	1065312	2 to 6 Old Palace Terrace More images
No. 10 Richmond Green	Richmond TW9 1PX	Terraced house	Early 18th century	10 January 1950	TQ1783074935; 51°27′40″N 0°18′19″W	1357746	No. 10 Richmond Green
No 11, and Railings	Richmond	Terraced house, and railings	18th century	10 January 1950	TQ1782774931; 51°27′40″N 0°18′19″W	1065348	No 11, and Railings
No. 12 Richmond Green	Richmond TW9 1PX	Terraced house	18th century	10 January 1950	TQ1782374926; 51°27′40″N 0°18′19″W	1181111	No. 12 Richmond Green
No. 32 Richmond Green	Richmond	Terraced house	Early 18th century	10 January 1950	TQ1772274868; 51°27′38″N 0°18′25″W	1357770	No. 32 Richmond Green
No. 3-12 Sion Road	Twickenham TW1 3DR	Terrace	Early 18th century	2 September 1952	TQ1668273396; 51°26′51″N 0°19′20″W	1262089	No. 3-12 Sion Road More images
18 Station Road	Barnes, London SW13 0LW	House	Earlier	12 May 1950	TQ2180176319; 51°28′22″N 0°14′52″W	1252850	18 Station Road More images
Old Court House	The Wardrobe, Richmond TW9 1PB	House	Early 18th century	9 February 1952	TQ1756774959; 51°27′41″N 0°18′33″W	1181217	Old Court House More images
Old Palace Place	The Green, Richmond TW9 1NQ	House	Late C16/C17	10 January 1950	TQ1767374825; 51°27′37″N 0°18′27″W	1065314	Old Palace Place More images
Ormeley Lodge, with Gates and Railings to Front	Ham Gate Avenue, Ham, TW10 5HB	Country house	Late C17/Early 18th century	10 January 1950	TQ1807672051; 51°26′07″N 0°18′10″W	1286489	Ormeley Lodge, with Gates and Railings to Front More images
Pope's Grotto in Grounds of St Catherine's High School	Twickenham	Grotto	C19-20	2 September 1952	TQ1595672690; 51°26′29″N 0°19′59″W	1192178	Pope's Grotto in Grounds of St Catherine's High School
Richmond Theatre	Little Green, Richmond TW9 1QJ	Theatre	1899	28 June 1972	TQ1792875046; 51°27′44″N 0°18′14″W	1065384	Richmond Theatre More images
Rutland Lodge and Entrance Gate and Piers to Rutland Lodge	145 Petersham Road, Petersham, Richmond TW10 7AA	House	Late 17th century	10 January 1950	TQ1801173292; 51°26′47″N 0°18′12″W	1065338	Rutland Lodge and Entrance Gate and Piers to Rutland Lodge More images
Sandycombe Lodge	40 Sandycoombe Road, Twickenham TW1 2LR	Studio house	Early 19th century	2 September 1952	TQ1708774105; 51°27′14″N 0°18′59″W	1262429	Sandycombe Lodge More images
Seaforth House	Church Terrace, Richmond TW10 6SE	Terraced house	Early 18th century	10 January 1950	TQ1795874744; 51°27′34″N 0°18′13″W	1261555	Seaforth House
Seymour House Warwick House	Montpelier Row, Twickenham TW1 2NQ	House	1720	2 September 1952	TQ1697473820; 51°27′05″N 0°19′05″W	1194493	Seymour House Warwick House
Sion Cottage	Sion Road, Twickenham TW1 3DD	House	Early 18th century	2 September 1952	TQ1671173358; 51°26′50″N 0°19′19″W	1262088	Sion Cottage
Sion House, Railings and Piers	Sion Road, Twickenham TW1 3DD	House	Early 18th century	2 September 1952	TQ1670673360; 51°26′50″N 0°19′19″W	1252847	Sion House, Railings and Piers
Sudbrook Cottage	Sudbrook Lane, Petersham TW10 7AT	House	Late C17/Early 18th century	10 January 1950	TQ1810873040; 51°26′39″N 0°18′07″W	1262065	Upload Photo
Sudbrook Lodge	Petersham Road, Richmond TW10 5HA	House	Early 18th century	10 January 1950	TQ1793672133; 51°26′09″N 0°18′17″W	1253016	Sudbrook Lodge
The Old Court House	Hampton Court Road, Hampton KT8 9BW	House	Early 18th century	25 June 1983	TQ1539768645; 51°24′18″N 0°20′32″W	1080796	The Old Court House More images
The Old Vicarage School	48 Richmond Hill, Richmond TW10 6QX	House	Extant c1680	24 December 1968	TQ1806474399; 51°27′23″N 0°18′08″W	1249946	The Old Vicarage School More images
The Pavilion	Hampton Court Palace, East Molesey KT8 9AP	Bowling green pavilion	1700–01	2 September 1952	TQ1627167534; 51°23′42″N 0°19′49″W	1080801	The Pavilion More images
The Terrace	3 Richmond Hill, Richmond TW10 6RE	House	1767	10 January 1950	TQ1797474460; 51°27′25″N 0°18′12″W	1249952	The Terrace
Underground Passage at Radnor Lodge	Radnor Road, Twickenham	Grotto	18th century	25 June 1983	TQ1578272840; 51°26′34″N 0°20′08″W	1065344	Upload Photo
Underground Passage in Grounds of St Catherine's High School	Under the junction of Radnor Road and Grotto Road, Cross Deep, Twickenham TW1 4QJ	Grotto	18th century	25 June 1983	TQ1580072823; 51°26′33″N 0°20′07″W	1080811	Upload Photo
York House, Garden Walls Wrought Iron Gates and Boundary Walls Along Sion Road on the East Side and Riverside on the South	Richmond Road, Twickenham TW1 3AA	House	Earlier	2 September 1952	TQ1654273401; 51°26′51″N 0°19′28″W	1263365	York House, Garden Walls Wrought Iron Gates and Boundary Walls Along Sion Road on the East Side and Riverside on the South More images

== See also ==
- Grade I listed buildings in Richmond upon Thames
