= Grove House =

Grove House may refer to:

in the United Kingdom

- Grove House, Dunstable, a listed municipal building in Bedfordshire
- Grove House, Hampton, a listed building in Richmond upon Thames
- Grove House, Hampstead, formerly part of Admiral's House, Hampstead
- Grove House, Harrogate, a listed former inn, school, house and orphanage in North Yorkshire
- Grove House, Manchester, a listed building in Greater Manchester
- Grove House, Roehampton, a listed building in London
- Arnos Grove house, a listed house in Southgate, London
- The Grove House, a house of Harrow School, Harrow, London
- Nuffield Lodge, Regent's Park, London, also known as Grove House

in the United States

- John A. Grove House, Bluffton, Indiana
- Dr. John Grove House and Office, Liberty, Indiana
- Benjamin Grove House, Louisville, Kentucky, listed on the National Register of Historic Places
- Claud D. Grove and Berenice Sinclair Grove House, Jefferson City, Missouri
