= Petersham House =

House in Petersham, London

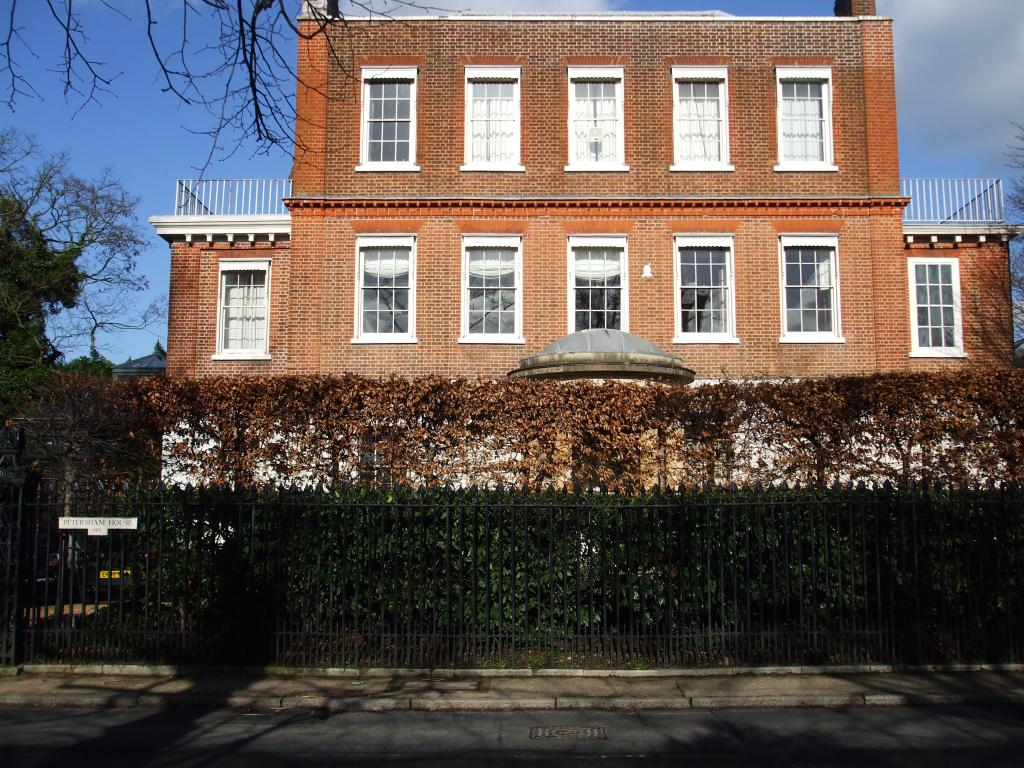
- Interactive map of the Petersham House area

General information
- Location: Petersham, London England
- Coordinates: 51.4465°N 0.3018°W
- Completed: c. 1674

Listed Building – Grade II*
- Official name: Garden Gates and Railings Petersham House
- Designated: 10 January 1950
- Reference no.: 1065336

Petersham House is a Grade II* listed building in Petersham, London built in the late 17th century. It is listed alongside its garden gates and railings, and holds early 18th-century mythological wall paintings by Louis Laguerre.

The house has extensive gardens covering over a third of an acre, which provides herbs and edible flowers for the adjacent Petersham Nurseries cafe.

== History ==
The house's author and original owner are not known. In the 18th century, the Montrose and Rutland families who owned the nearby Rutland Lodge and Montrose House would each consecutively own Petersham House. In the 19th century, the house was owned by Samuel Walker whose daughter in 1898 bought the nearby land of Bute House and had the All Saints' Church built there which still stands now as a private residence. Restoration work was carried out on the house by its owners in the 1990s, removing certain more recently added elements.
