= Grade I listed buildings in the London Borough of Richmond upon Thames =

There are over 9,000 Grade I listed buildings in England. This page is a list of these buildings in the London Borough of Richmond upon Thames.

== Buildings ==
=== Hampton Court Palace ===
| Name | Location | Type | Completed (Note: The date given is the date used by Historic England as significant for the initial building or that of an important part in the structure's description.) | Date designated | Grid ref. (Note: Sometimes known as OSGB36, the grid reference is based on the British national grid reference system used by the Ordnance Survey.) Geo-coordinates | Entry number (Note: The "List Entry Number" is a unique number assigned to each listed building and scheduled monument by Historic England.) | Image |
|---|---|---|---|---|---|---|---|
| Hampton Court Palace | Hampton Court | Royal palace | 1529–40 | 2 September 1952 | TQ1573968461; 51°24′12″N 0°20′15″W | 1193127 | Hampton Court Palace More images |
| Banqueting House | Hampton Court | Banqueting house | c. 1700 | 2 September 1952 | TQ1565868339; 51°24′08″N 0°20′19″W | 1357714 | Banqueting House More images |
| Barracks | Hampton Court | Apartment | 1689 | 2 September 1952 | TQ1553668575; 51°24′16″N 0°20′25″W | 1080810 | Barracks More images |
| Flowerpot Gate | Hampton Court | Gate | Late 17th century | 2 September 1952 | TQ1587868796; 51°24′23″N 0°20′07″W | 1358067 | Flowerpot Gate More images |
| Fountain Garden Gates | Hampton Court | Gate | William III | 2 September 1952 | TQ1598168298; 51°24′07″N 0°20′03″W | 1065439 | Fountain Garden Gates More images |
| Fountain Garden Gates | Hampton Court | Gate | Victorian | 2 September 1952 | TQ1601268521; 51°24′14″N 0°20′01″W | 1357713 | Fountain Garden Gates More images |
| Lion Gates | Hampton Court | Gate | Early 18th century | 2 September 1952 | TQ1575868791; 51°24′23″N 0°20′14″W | 1065442 | Lion Gates More images |
| Lower Orangery | Hampton Court | Orangery | William III | 2 September 1952 | TQ1566268428; 51°24′11″N 0°20′19″W | 1193195 | Lower Orangery More images |
| Perimeter Walls and Railings | Hampton Court | Wall | Tudor and later | 2 September 1952 | TQ1579168256; 51°24′05″N 0°20′13″W | 1358066 | Perimeter Walls and Railings More images |
| Privy Garden Tijou Screen | Hampton Court | Screen and railings | Late 17th century | 2 September 1952 | TQ1574768195; 51°24′04″N 0°20′15″W | 1065441 | Privy Garden Tijou Screen More images |
| Privy Garden Sundial | Hampton Court | Sundial | William III | 2 September 1952 | TQ1576168385; 51°24′10″N 0°20′14″W | 1065446 | Privy Garden Sundial More images |
| Royal Mews and Great Barn | Hampton Court | Kitchen | 19th century | 2 September 1952 | TQ1529568715; 51°24′21″N 0°20′38″W | 1192945 | Royal Mews and Great Barn More images |
| Royal Tennis Court | Hampton Court Palace | Real tennis court | c. 1625 | 2 September 1952 | TQ1583168581; 51°24′16″N 0°20′10″W | 1080809 | Royal Tennis Court More images |
| Tilt Yard Tower | Hampton Court | Tiltyard tower | Early 16th century | 2 September 1952 | TQ1564768704; 51°24′20″N 0°20′19″W | 1065440 | Tilt Yard Tower More images |
| Trophy Gates | Hampton Court | Gates | Trophies and statues, early 18th century, gates 19th century | 2 September 1952 | TQ1546268588; 51°24′16″N 0°20′29″W | 1065444 | Trophy Gates More images |

=== Royal Botanic Gardens, Kew ===
| Name | Location | Type | Completed | Date designated | Grid ref. Geo-coordinates | Entry number | Image |
|---|---|---|---|---|---|---|---|
| Kew Palace | Royal Botanic Gardens, Kew | Country house | 1631 | 10 January 1950 | TQ1848277474; 51°29′02″N 0°17′42″W | 1263073 | Kew Palace More images |
| Kew Palace Flats (Former royal kitchens) | Royal Botanic Gardens, Kew | Kitchen | 1731-35 | 25 May 1983 | TQ1846077406; 51°29′00″N 0°17′43″W | 1263074 | Kew Palace Flats (Former royal kitchens) More images |
| Orangery | Royal Botanic Gardens, Kew | Orangery | 1761 | 10 January 1950 | TQ1862077421; 51°29′00″N 0°17′35″W | 1263075 | Orangery More images |
| Great Pagoda | Royal Botanic Gardens, Kew | Pagoda | 1761-2 | 10 January 1950 | TQ1846876078; 51°28′17″N 0°17′45″W | 1262593 | Great Pagoda More images |
| The Palm House | Royal Botanic Gardens, Kew | Palm House | 1844–48 | 10 January 1950 | TQ1865476949; 51°28′45″N 0°17′34″W | 1262670 | The Palm House More images |
| Temperate House | Royal Botanic Gardens, Kew | Temperate House | 1860 | 10 January 1950 | TQ1847776452; 51°28′29″N 0°17′44″W | 1262590 | Temperate House More images |

=== Other ===
| Name | Location | Type | Completed | Date designated | Grid ref. Geo-coordinates | Entry number | Image |
|---|---|---|---|---|---|---|---|
| Arethusa or 'Diana' Fountain | Bushy Park | Sculpture | 1637 | 2 September 1952 | TQ1581369190; 51°24′36″N 0°20′10″W | 1080871 | Arethusa or 'Diana' Fountain More images |
| Asgill House | Old Palace Lane, Richmond | Country house | 1767 | 10 January 1950 | TQ1736074839; 51°27′37″N 0°18′44″W | 1180412 | Asgill House More images |
| Chapel in the Wood, Strawberry Hill | Twickenham | Chapel | c. 1760 | 25 May 1983 | TQ1573072132; 51°26′11″N 0°20′11″W | 1253028 | Chapel in the Wood, Strawberry Hill More images |
| Church of All Hallows | Twickenham | Tower | 1940 | 2 September 1952 | TQ1586774115; 51°27′15″N 0°20′02″W | 1080836 | Church of All Hallows More images |
| Garrick's Shakespeare Temple | Hampton | Statue | c. 1765 | 2 September 1952 | TQ1419069427; 51°24′45″N 0°21′34″W | 1065456 | Garrick's Shakespeare Temple More images |
| Garrick's Villa | Hampton | Villa | 1756 | 2 September 1952 | TQ1423169461; 51°24′46″N 0°21′32″W | 1193477 | Garrick's Villa More images |
| Maids of Honour Row and its gates and railings | 1-4 Richmond Green, Richmond | Terrace of houses, gates and railings | c. 1720 | 10 January 1950 | TQ1762074912; 51°27′39″N 0°18′30″W | 1065317 | Maids of Honour Row and its gates and railings More images |
| Ham House | Ham | House | 1610 | 10 January 1950 | TQ1726273046; 51°26′39″N 0°18′51″W | 1080832 | Ham House More images |
| Kew Observatory | Richmond | Observatory | 1768-69 | 10 January 1950 | TQ1715975781; 51°28′08″N 0°18′53″W | 1357729 | Kew Observatory More images |
| Marble Hill House | Twickenham | Country house | 1724-29 | 2 September 1952 | TQ1729673627; 51°26′58″N 0°18′48″W | 1285673 | Marble Hill House More images |
| Orleans House the Octagon Room and Service Wing Adjoining | Twickenham | House | 1710 | 2 September 1952 | TQ1690673379; 51°26′50″N 0°19′09″W | 1250280 | Orleans House the Octagon Room and Service Wing Adjoining More images |
| Richmond Bridge | Richmond | Bridge | 1777 | 2 September 1952 | TQ1771774514; 51°27′27″N 0°18′25″W | 1180951 | Richmond Bridge More images |
| Richmond Golf Club, Sudbrook Park | Sudbrook Park, Petersham | House | 1726 | 10 January 1950 | TQ1845572574; 51°26′23″N 0°17′50″W | 1252877 | Richmond Golf Club, Sudbrook Park More images |
| Strawberry Hill (St Mary's Training College) | Twickenham | Country house | 1749–76 | 2 September 1952 | TQ1581772315; 51°26′17″N 0°20′06″W | 1261987 | Strawberry Hill (St Mary's Training College) More images |
| Richmond Palace Gate House | Richmond | House | 18th century | 10 January 1950 | TQ1757974929; 51°27′40″N 0°18′32″W | 1065318 | Richmond Palace Gate House More images |
| Richmond Palace Trumpeters' House | Richmond | House | Early 18th century | 10 January 1950 | TQ1752974883; 51°27′39″N 0°18′35″W | 1357749 | Richmond Palace Trumpeters' House More images |
| Richmond Palace Wardrobe | Richmond | House | 16th century | 25 June 1983 | TQ1756274907; 51°27′39″N 0°18′33″W | 1357730 | Richmond Palace Wardrobe More images |
| White Lodge | Richmond Park | Hunting lodge | 1727-29 | 10 March 1981 | TQ2068173227; 51°26′43″N 0°15′54″W | 1250045 | White Lodge More images |
| The Wick and Wick Cottage | Richmond Hill | House | 1775 | 10 January 1950 | TQ1835273884; 51°27′06″N 0°17′53″W | 1250041 | The Wick and Wick Cottage More images |

== See also ==
- Grade II* listed buildings in Richmond upon Thames
