= Ranelagh Harriers =

Running club in Richmond, London, England

Ranelagh Harriers is a road running and cross-country club based in Petersham, Richmond, south-west London, England. The headquarters are its clubhouse, which is behind The Dysart restaurant and right next to Richmond Park, allowing plenty of opportunity for off-road running. Ranelagh athletes compete in many events from the 5k to ultramarathons on a variety of terrains, and in the Surrey Road League and the Surrey Cross Country League.

== The early days ==
Ranelagh Harriers was founded in 1881, and so is one of the oldest athletics clubs in the United Kingdom. It was one of the founder members of the English Cross Country Union, in 1883, and is now one of only eleven of those founder members still in existence. The club's first home was at the Green Man on Putney Heath, and the earliest recorded runs were out to the Windmill on Wimbledon Common and back. Re-development forced the club to look for a new home during the mid-1930s, and a suitable site was found in an old pavilion at the back of the Dysart Arms, right on the edge of Richmond Park. New courses were quickly devised in the park and the club settled in, only for activities to be interrupted by the Second World War, when the park was closed for the duration of the war.

=== Post-war ===
The end of hostilities brought a period of struggle for survival for Ranelagh. By the mid-1950s things were on the upturn, and the club started to look at improving its accommodation at the Dysart. In 1967, a new pre-fabricated dressing room was erected, though the old ramshackle bath-house was still in use. After further years of fund-raising, the new purpose-built clubhouse was finally opened in 1988 and the process was completed in 1995 with the purchase of the land on which the clubhouse stands – giving Ranelagh security of tenure in perpetuity.

Ranelagh has a sister organisation, the Montgomery County Road Runners Club (MCRRC), in Montgomery County, Maryland (near Washington, D.C.); its members have full reciprocal membership privileges when visiting the MCRRC.

== Competitions ==
Ranelagh Harriers hosts two events as part of the Surrey Road League, the Ranelagh Richmond 10k and the Richmond Half Marathon.

Members of Ranelagh Harriers currently help to organise two runs in the 5k Parkrun family, held every Saturday morning at 9:00am; the one-lap event in Richmond Park, and a three-lap run at Old Deer Park.

== Notable members ==
Notable members include:

- Chris Brasher (1928–2003), track and field athlete, sports journalist and co-founder of the London Marathon
- John Disley (1928–2016), athlete and co-founder of the London Marathon
- Hugh Jones (born 1955), the first Welshman to win the London Marathon
- Bill Neely (born 1959), journalist
- Paul Sinton-Hewitt (born 1960), founder of parkrun
- Ed Whitlock (1931–2017), Canadian long-distance runner
