= Thomas Jenner (judge) =

English barrister (1637–1707)

Sir Thomas Jenner (1637–1707) was an English barrister, Baron of the Exchequer and Justice of the Common Pleas, closely associated with the Stuart kings Charles II and James II of England.

== Life ==
He was born at Mayfield, Sussex, eldest son of Thomas Jenner of that place, and Dorothy, his wife, daughter of Jeffrey Glyde of Dallington. He was educated at Tunbridge grammar school, under Nicholas Grey. In 1665 he became a pensioner of Queens' College, Cambridge, but left without taking a degree. He entered the Inner Temple in 1658, and was called to the bar in 1663, after which he practised chiefly in the court of exchequer.

In 1683 Charles II, having withdrawn the charter of the City of London, appointed a Lord Mayor, two sheriffs, and a recorder, who was Jenner. A few days earlier Jenner was knighted, and received an augmentation of arms. In the following January he was made king's sergeant. As king's sergeant and as recorder he took part in the state trials of the next two years, including those of Algernon Sidney and Henry Cornish. In the parliament of 1685 he represented the borough of Rye, until in 1686 be was raised to the bench as a Baron of the Exchequer. With the majority of the judges, Jenner gave judgment in favour of the king's claim to the dispensing power which was raised in the case of Sir Edward Hales.

In October 1687 Jenner was appointed one of the three royal commissioners to inquire into the appointment of a president of Magdalen College, Oxford; the other commissioners were Robert Wright and Thomas Cartwright. Jenner's diary of the proceedings survived in the library of Magdalen College. Cartwright sought to have him dismissed from the commission, finding him too moderate if outwardly overbearing to the fellows, and in the end Jenner voted against the expulsions.

In July 1688 he was promoted to the common pleas. But the Glorious Revolution soon involved him. On the night of James II's flight Jenner was one of those who endeavoured to escape to France with the king. The king's general pardon to him and money were stolen at this point from his chambers in Serjeants' Inn; and he was captured at Faversham and brought to Canterbury. Early in January 1689 he and others prisoners were committed to the Tower of London, charged with subverting the Protestant religion and the laws and liberties of the kingdom. They were admitted to bail, but the Convention parliament voted that Jenner was principally concerned in the arbitrary proceedings under James, and he was committed to the custody of the sergeant-at-arms. He was released when parliament was prorogued in January 1690. In 1691, when the Act of Indemnity was passed, Jenner was excepted from its provisions, but no proceedings were then taken against him.

In November 1691 one of his sons was given into the custody of a messenger of parliament for circulating libels against the right of William and Mary to the crown. Jenner was then charged with having levied fines in James's reign to the amount of £3,000 on dissenters without returning the money into court. Jenner pleaded the general pardon from the king, which had been stolen; special mention was said to be made there of those fines, which had supposedly gone direct to the king. The plea was allowed, and the prosecution failed.

Expelled from the bench by William III's government, Jenner resumed his practice at the bar. He died at his house at Petersham on 1 January 1707, and was buried in St Peter's Church, Petersham, with a tablet to his memory, with his arms, and an inscription composed by his daughter Margaret, Lady Darnell.

== Family ==
On 1 January 1661 he married, at the church of St. Mary Woolchurch Haw, in the City of London, Anne, daughter and heiress of James Poe of Swinden Hall, Kirkby Overblow, Yorkshire, by whom he had eight sons and two daughters.
