= Selim Koray =

Turkish businessman (born 1962)

- Born: 1962 (age 63–64); Istanbul, Turkey
- Citizenship: Turkish
- Education: St. Joseph French Lycee, Istanbul; Eastern Michigan University, United States
- Occupation: Businessman (board member at Koray Group of Companies)
- Children: Two
- Parent: Ayduk Koray
- Website: http://www.koray.com/

Selim Koray (born 1962 (age 63–64)) is a Turkish businessman, former director of Fenerbahce and Turkey national teams.

After his high school years at St. Joseph French Lycee in Kadıköy, İstanbul, he continued his university education in the United States at Eastern Michigan University studying business administration.

He is one of the three children of Hüseyin Ayduk Esat Koray, the founder of Koray Group of Companies, one of the leading Turkish construction companies, his father, a national basketball team player was also one of the first captains in the earlier years of Fenerbahce.

Selim Koray who is one of the founders of Yapı Kredi Koray GYO has been working within the Koray Groups’ construction, real estate, facility management and insurance companies since 1987.

Selim Koray has also played volleyball in the teams of the Saint Joseph High School in the late 1970s and he is a founding member of the 1907 Fenerbahce Association. Selim Koray has also served as the managing director of the Fenerbahce Basketball Team in the mid 1990s.

In 2012–2013, he became a board member of the Turkish Football Federation and the managing director of the Turkey national teams and the Director of the Football Development Department. He later resigned from the federation at his own will.

He has also served as a board member of Doğuş Automotive and a board member of the Turkish-American Business Council, he is fluent in English and French.

Married and father of two, among his hobbies golf and football play an important role. He is a member of the Istanbul Golf Club, KG&CC, The Richmond Golf Club in London and he is also Senior Advisory Council Member of the Fenerbahce Sports Club.

== See also ==
- Turkish Football Federation
- Fenerbahçe Sports Club
