= Ernest Law =

English historian and barrister

Ernest Philip Alphonso Law CB CVO (26 August 1854 – 25 February 1930) was an English historian and barrister.

Law came from an old Westmorland family and was a grandson of Lord Ellenborough, Lord Chief Justice of England. His parents were William Towry Law and Matilda Montgomery, daughter of Sir Conyngham Montgomery, 1st Baronet. The diplomat Sir Algernon Law was his brother and Major-Generals Francis Law and Victor Law were his half-brothers. A Roman Catholic, he was educated at Oscott College and University College, London, from which he graduated BA in 1874. He was called to the bar by the Inner Temple in 1878 and practised on the South-Eastern Circuit and at the Parliamentary bar. From 1891 to 1896 he was Comptroller and Secretary of the Provident Institution Savings Bank.

An expert on Tudor history, Law was appointed official historian at Hampton Court Palace and given a residence there, The Pavilion, where he lived until his death. He was largely responsible for the return of the Tijou screens in the Privy Garden. He was also a Shakespeare scholar and a scholar of historic gardens, designing the knott garden and the Elizabethan borders of Shakespeare's garden at New Place, Stratford-upon-Avon, where he was a trustee of the Shakespeare Birthplace Trust. He also designed the sunken garden at the Brompton Hospital Sanatorium at Frimley and the garden theatre at Esher Place. He authenticated the Cunningham Papers at the Public Record Office, the 17th-century account books of the Office of Revels which had been bought by the British Museum in 1868.

His best-known work was A Short History of Hampton Court (1897), abridged from his longer histories. He also wrote History of Hampton Court, Royal Gallery of Hampton Court, Vandyck's and Holbein's Pictures at Windsor Castle, Kensington Palace, Shakespeare as a Groom of the Chamber (1910), Some Supposed Shakespeare Forgeries (1911), Dancing on Ice (1911), More about Shakespeare Forgeries (1913), England’s First Great War Minister (1916), The Tempest as originally produced at Court (1920), Mantegna's Triumph of Julius Cæsar, as now hung in the old Orangery at Hampton Court (1921), Commonwealth or Empire (1921), Shakespeare’s Garden (1922), Henry VIII's Great Kitchen at Hampton Court, and Hampton Court Gardens: Old and New (1926).

He was appointed Companion of the Order of the Bath (CB) in the 1920 New Year War Honours and Commander of the Royal Victorian Order (CVO) in the 1926 New Year Honours.

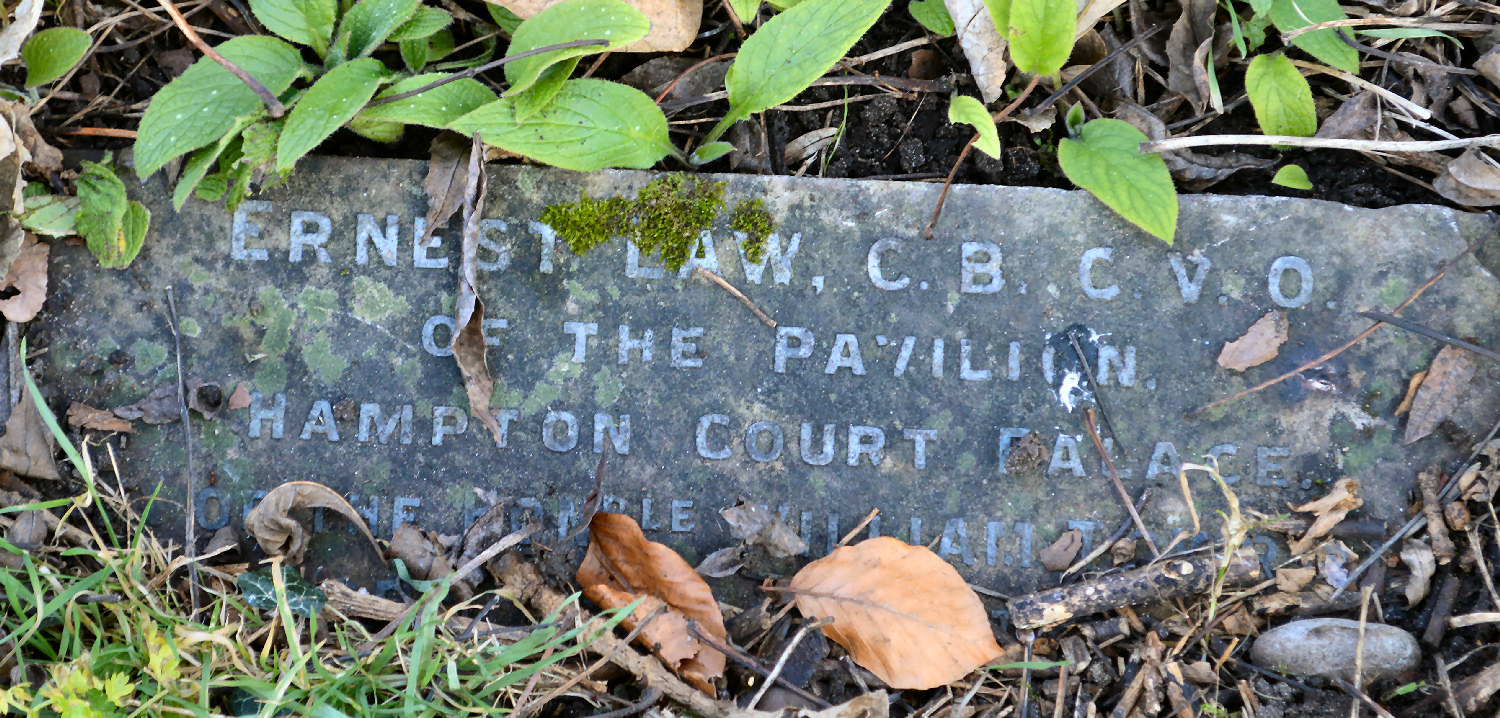
St Mary Magdalen, Mortlake

He died at The Pavilion, Hampton Court and is buried in the churchyard of St Mary Magdalen Church, Mortlake.

His widow Katherine, whom he married in 1890, died at Hampton Court in 1954 at the age of 99. Known for her beauty in her younger days and a recluse after her husband's death, she was one of the longest residents of the palace.
