= Bethlehem Chapel, Richmond =

- Bethlehem (Independent Calvinistic) Chapel, Richmond
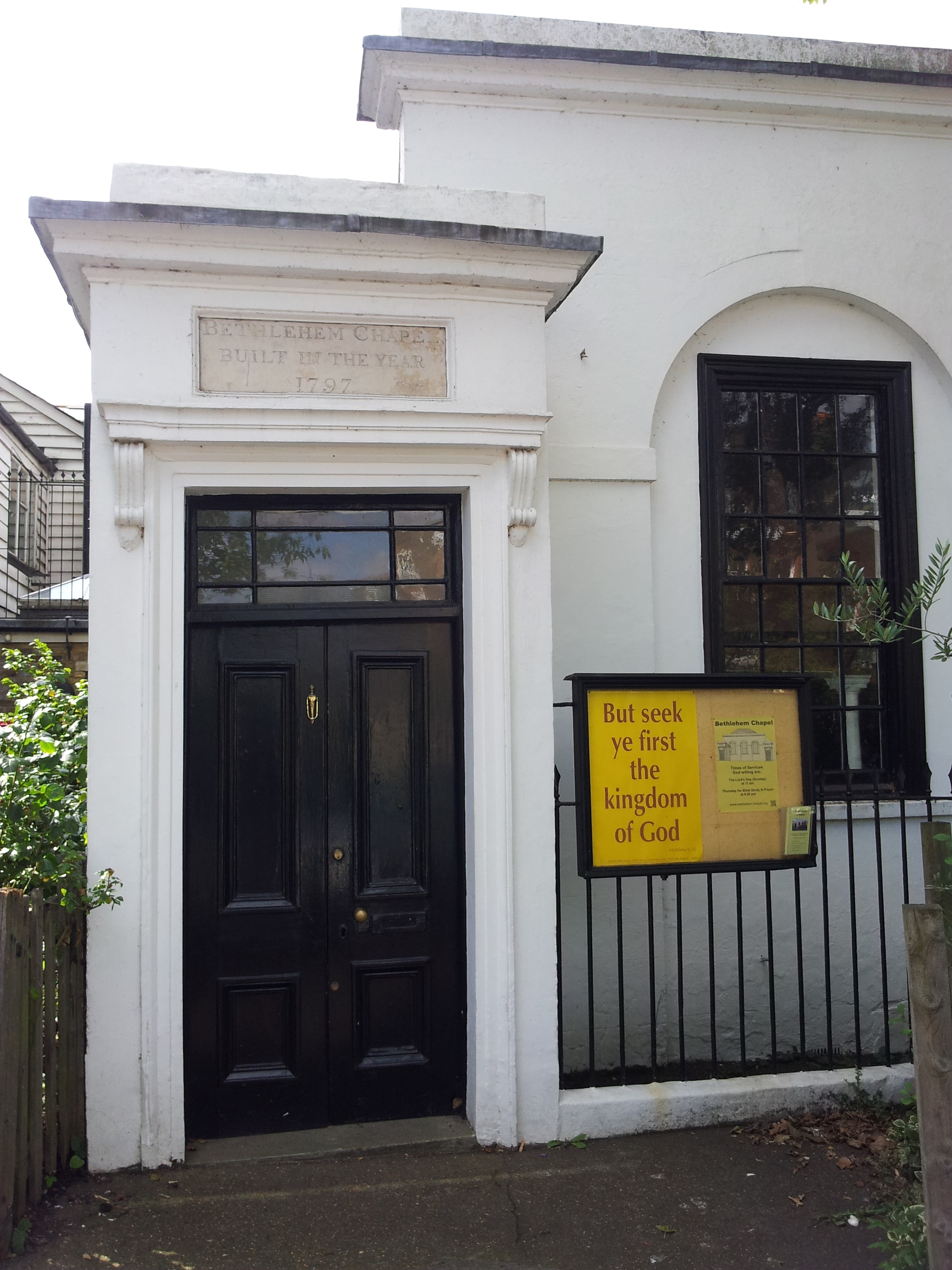
- Bethlehem Chapel, Richmond
- 51.4591°N 0.3038°W,
- OS grid reference: TQ 17937 74712
- Location: Church Terrace, Richmond, London TW10 6SE
- Country: England
- Denomination: Independent Calvinistic
- Website: www.bethlehem-chapel.org

Listed Building – Grade II*
- Designated: 24 December 1968
- Reference no.: 1358048

History
- Founded: 1797
- Founder: John Chapman

Architecture
- Functional status: Active

Clergy
- Pastor: Robert Goodgame

Bethlehem Chapel, Richmond is an independent Calvinistic chapel on the east side of Church Terrace in Richmond, London. Built in 1797, the small one-storey stuccoed building is Grade II* listed. It still has its original galleried interior with pews and pulpit.

== History ==
The church was built by John Chapman, who was a market gardener in Petersham. It was funded by subscription and is known as a "Huntington Chapel" as it was opened by Calvinist preacher William Huntington who founded or opened chapels throughout England, many of which have survived.

Hansard records a petition to the House of Lords on 14 May 1846 by "Thomas William Dawson, on behalf of the Church and Congregation of Protestant Dissenters of Bethlehem Chapel, Richmond, in favour of the Charitable Trusts Bill".

== Services and other activities ==
The church is traditional in worship and doctrine and uses the Authorised King James Version of the Bible. Services are held on Sunday mornings at 11:00 am. There are prayer and Bible study sessions on Thursday evenings at 8:00 pm.
