= The Old Court House =

Historic site in London Borough, Richmond upon Thames, England

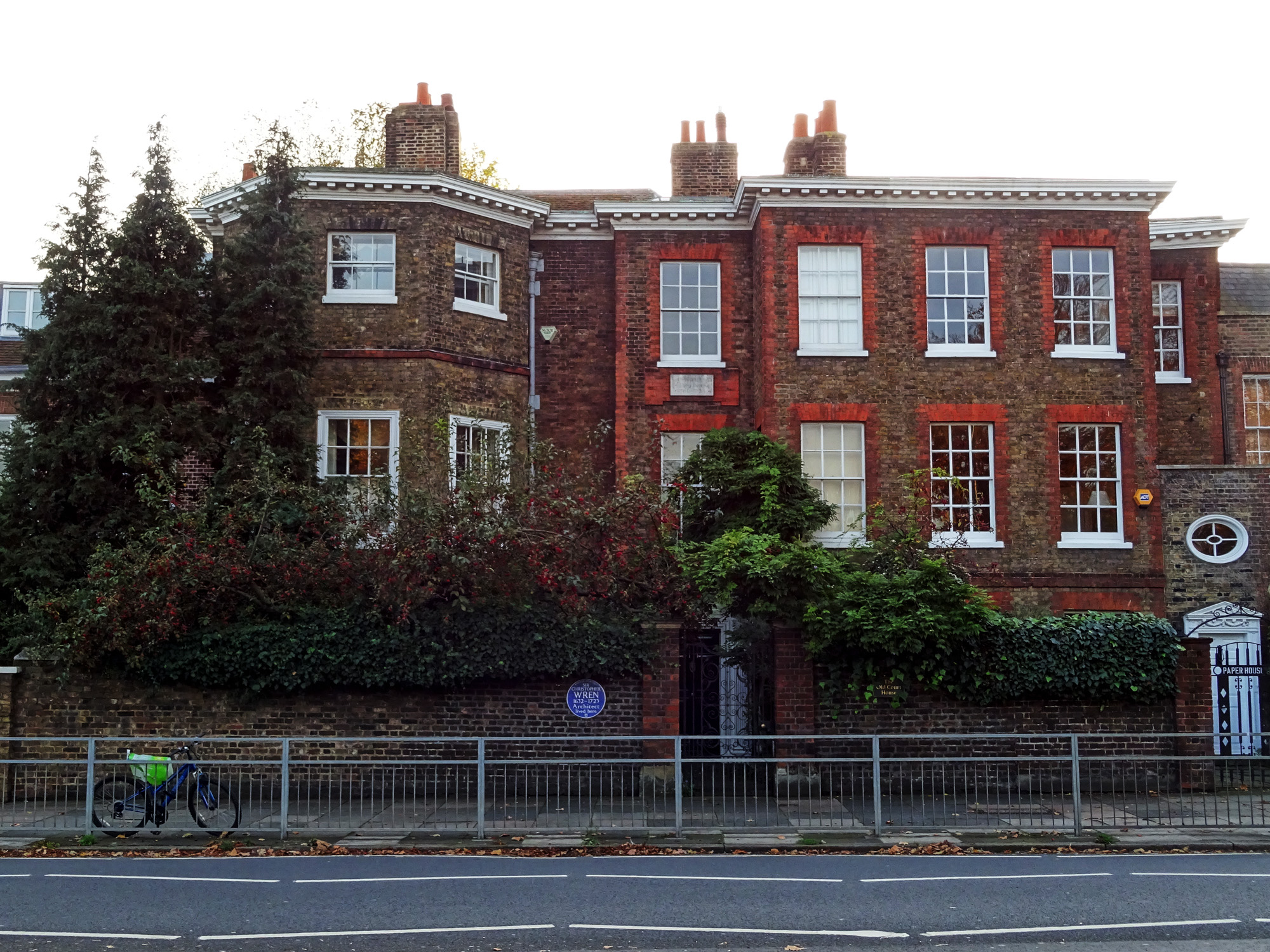

- Location within Greater London
- 51°24′18.4″N 0°20′32.5″W
- Location: Hampton Court Green, London Borough of Richmond upon Thames, England

History
- Built: early 18th century

Site notes
- Architectural style: Queen Anne style
- Governing body: Privately owned

Listed Building – Grade II*
- Official name: The Old Court House
- Designated: 25 June 1983
- Reference no.: 1080796

The Old Court House is a Grade II* listed house located off Hampton Court Green in the London Borough of Richmond upon Thames; its origins date back to 1536. The architect Sir Christopher Wren, who lived there from 1708 to 1723, was given a 50-year lease on the property by Queen Anne in lieu of overdue payments for his work on St Paul's Cathedral. The lease passed from Wren's son to his grandson. It was purchased from the Crown Estate in 1984.

King Henry VIII obtained the newly built Hampton Court Palace from Cardinal Wolsey in 1526. From that time onwards, all the property around Hampton Court also became the property of the monarch and this included The Old Court House. It is the only house on Hampton Court Green, other than Hampton Court itself, to have a garden that stretches to the River Thames.

Wren's dining room is now used as a study. This beautifully proportioned room features wood panelling chosen by Wren and a fine marble fireplace similar to the one he installed for King William III in the King's dining room in Hampton Court Palace. Beyond the reception hall, a flight of stone steps take you into the garden which leads down to the Thames. In Wren's day his most important visitors, normally royalty, would arrive by river, walk across the garden and up those steps to enter his house via the back door. This meant the garden had to be just as magnificent as the house. The building is accordingly surrounded by several different types of tree and copious bushes bursting with figs, walnuts, apples, crab apples, cherries, raspberries, mint and borage. The greenery extends all the way to the river bank.

== History ==
King Henry VIII took the newly built Hampton Court Palace from Cardinal Wolsey in 1526. All the property around Hampton Court then belonged to the monarch.

In 1669, Wren (1632–1723) was appointed as the Royal Surveyor by King Charles II. Previously, Inigo Jones and Sir John Denham held this post. The King had been impressed by Wren's plans to reconstruct the City of London after the Great Fire of 1666. The Royal Surveyor, or Surveyor General, was like a modern Minister of Works. He ordered the King's works at all of the palaces; Hampton Court, Greenwich, St James Palace and Windsor Castle. Wren held this post for 49 years until 1718, straddling 5 reigns: Charles II, James II, William III and Mary II, and Anne and George I, while at the same time building many city churches, including St Paul's Cathedral.

At each Royal palace, the Surveyor General had lodgings. These at Hampton Court became the Old Court House Built in 1536. Wren's biggest task at Hampton Court was the construction of the Eastern part of Hampton Court Palace (the square part) including the main East and South fronts, and Fountain Court. William and Mary had wanted to rebuild Hampton Court Palace entirely, but with the early death of Mary in 1694, King William lost heart. The project was only half done. Hampton Court was left as it remains today, half Tudor and half Wren.

Wren, already aged 76, was granted in 1708, a 50-year lease of The Old Court House by Queen Anne. This was partly in lieu of arrears of salary for building St Paul's Cathedral. He had been paid on a time basis. The authorities thought that, to be paid more, he had dragged his feet.

“In an act of parliament in the ninth year of the reign of King William for the completing and adorning of the cathedral church of St Paul, London, a clause was inserted to suspend a moiety (i.e. half) of the surveyor’s salary until the said church should be finished; thereby the better to encourage to him to finish the same with the utmost diligence and expedition.

“It was at this time a common notion and misreport that the surveyor received a large annual salary for that building and consequently it was in his interest to prolong the finishing of the fabrick for the continuance of this supposed emolument. Which it would seem occasioned that clause...

“Upon the compleating of this great fabric (St Paul’s Cathedral in 1708) a clause passed in the act of parliament in the ninth year of the reign of Queen Anne declaring the church finished, to empower the commissioners to pay the surveyor the arrears of this moiety of his salary.”

NB: The bottom of page 344 says: “He then betook himself to country retirement.”

The word "retirement" here has its ancient meaning. It means withdraw or drawing back (not ceasing to be employed or moving house). Wren had already lived in the Old Court House since 1669, and since 1708 as long leaseholder.

The Treasury minutes, page 26 1708 say:

“Her Majesty (Queen Anne) observes that when Sir Christopher dies his house will go to his executors and consequently the surveyor of the works who will have no house at the Hampton Court. Nevertheless in regard Sir Christopher has been an old servant to the Crown, the Queen will gratify him in his request.”

Stephen Wren in 1749 sold the rest of his grandfather's 50-year Crown lease.

=== Wren and subsequent owners and occupiers ===
In 1669 Wren was appointed as the Royal Surveyor by King Charles II. He ordered the King's works at all of the palaces; Hampton Court, Greenwich, St James Palace and Windsor Castle. Wren held this post for 49 years until 1718, straddling five reigns; Charles II, James II, William III and Mary II, Anne and George I whilst at the same time building many city churches, including St Paul's Cathedral. At each palace the Royal Surveyor had lodgings. At Hampton Court these were The Old Court House.

Towards the end of World War I until 1921, The Old Court House was the temporary site of the Hampton Court Auxiliary Hospital which had been started by the British Red Cross and the Order of St. John to nurse wounded soldiers.

Subsequent lessees included Admiral Sir Alexander Montgomery, the Dowager Lady Clinton and General Sir Henry Wheatley.

Norman Lamplugh, a distinguished collector, lived at the house from 1908 to 1938 (see 1 October 1938 issue of Country Life). He was followed by the 2nd Earl of Ypres who was a watercolour painter. He was the son of 1st World War Field Marshal Sir John French who became the 1st Earl of Ypres.

In 1958, the form of tenure changed. In part exchange for an increase in the Queen's civil list, many Crown freeholds were passed from the property section of Buckingham Palace to Crown Estates. A 99-year Crown Estate lease began with Ronald Lee (at The Old Court House 1958–64). He was a well-known dealer in antiques, especially in clocks, in Bruton Street, London W1. His lease included permission to trade in antiques from The Old Court House. He hived off and sold the lease of the neighbouring Paper House which had been joined to the Old Court House since 1810. (Prior to 1810, The Old Court House had been called Paper House.)

In 1964, Ronald Lee sold the house to Stewart De Quincey Walker – the partner-in-crime of the notorious Emil Savundra. Both were jailed for fraud in 1968.

Earlier in 1966, the house was sold, reputedly for a suitcase full of banknotes, to Julian Reynolds. He sold the remaining 89-year lease in 1968 to Toby Jessel, then one of the two Greater London Council members for the London Borough of Richmond upon Thames, in which Hampton Court Palace and The Old Court House are both situated.

Toby Jessel was elected MP for Twickenham in 1970 and served for 27 years until 1997. He married Pippa Jephcott in 1967, but they were divorced in 1973. In 1980 he married the actress and singer Eira Heath and he owned The Old Court House for over 45 years.

In 1984 The Crown Estates department sold the freeholds to many leaseholders of houses around Hampton Court, Greenwich, St James and Windsor including The Old Court House, the freehold to which was acquired by Jessel. During his ownership of The Old Court House, Jessel entertained many people from the political establishment at The Old Court House, including Margaret Thatcher when she was Prime Minister of the United Kingdom.

== The Old Court House – the building ==
=== Tudor period ===
The original Tudor building of Old Court House was built for the Surveyor-general in 1536. The Knight Frank and Rutley brochure of 1966 p4 mentions a carved stone surround of Tudor design behind the existing Charles II fireplace in the study (formerly the dining room), but this has not been exposed.

Some of the brick wall in the garden is probably Tudor, being "English bond" (pre-1689 when William of Orange who became William III introduced "Flemish Bond"). The cobbled part of Faraday yard behind has similar cobbles to Tudor cobbles both in the palace and in the Royal mews in Hampton Court road. There is a (possibly) Tudor beam in the cellar, previously the kitchen.

=== Early changes to The Old Court House ===
1660–68 – Gerald Heath's paper pages (G) 1, 2, 3 shows works to the surveyors "lodgings" when the Royal Surveyor was Sir John Denham.

1669 – Wren became the Surveyor General; from 1670 repairs were made to the surveyors "house" (pages 3,4,5)

1706 – Wren referred to the "great decay" of the house, 1708 prior to Wren's 50-year lease; Savil Travers(?) reported it as "old and decayed and will be expensive to repair".

1708 – Wren's lease of 50 years started.

1709–10 – Wren undertook extensive renovations of The Old Court House in 1706. Wren altered the house a great deal- he built a virtually new house.

In 1708 Queen Anne granted him a 50-year lease on the property in lieu of overdue payments for his work on St Paul's Cathedral.

1723 – Death of Wren.

1730s or 1740s – The back (south) half of the house was added in the time of Christopher Wren junior. This includes the drawing room on the first floor, and 3 of the 5 bedrooms on the second floor, and the new dining room (previously the library) the back hall, and the kitchen on the ground floor.

In 1749 his grandson Stephen Wren sold the remainder of the lease.

=== Later changes to The Old Court House ===
1810–? – The master gardener's house (now called Paper House) was joined to the Old Court House to make one house. They were finally separated in 1960 after Ronald Lee had, in 1958, bought a 99-year Crown lease of the whole property.

The effects of the 1810 to 1960 join include a joint roof over the front; and the Old Court House cellar (the original kitchen) goes a little under Paper House. Neither has led to any problems between the two households.

1823 or later – The Greek motifs were put into the drawing room and what is now the master bedroom on the 1st floor probably by General Sir Henry Wheatley (era of Byron, and schools then taught Greek).

After 1858 the two drawing rooms were made into one. Lady Clinton put bow windows onto the front of the house.

Lamplugh (1908–38) installed works of art as set out in the Country Life article of 1 October 1938. He altered the back hall to put in two 16th-century Venetian paintings into the ceiling and put up the carved door into the current dining room.

De Quincey Walker (1964–66) put polished oak stripped floors into the hall and study on the ground floor and into the drawing room and landing on the first floor; he also installeda pillared and marble double bathroom on the first floor adjoining the master bedroom.

In 1968–69 Toby Jessel:

1. Put a new bathroom (the fourth bathroom in the house) beside the Red Room on the top floor – space was taken from the Chinese room.
2. Constructed a steel beam over the dining room ceiling to support a heavy chandelier.
3. Turned the library into the dining room and turned the dining room into a study.
4. Closed the second doorway from the main bedroom to the first-floor landing to create a second bedroom cupboard.
5. Closed the second doorway from the front hall to the study to create an alcove for books (this had been accessed from the kitchen to what had previously been the dining room).
6. Removed the dilapidated glass conservatory from the balcony outside first floor drawing room, and installed new balustrades.

=== Changes to the outbuildings and garden from the 1930s onwards ===
Front garden: Lamplugh put in a wrought iron gate, previously a wooden gate which is still in situ today.

Back garden: the early map marked "P" shows two gardens separated by a wall. The long thin one with parallel sides with access from the Thames, and the semi-trapezium shape to the west, presumably the kitchen garden. It is not known when the wall between was knocked down. Between the First and Second World Wars, what is now the Mitre Hotel's river garden was hived off from the Old Court House to the Mitre. The curved path leading round into it can be traced. Lamplugh had a small museum between the Green and the Mitre Hotel – traces of a doorway in the wall are still visible by Wren's pond.

In 1996 English Heritage commemorated Wren at the Old Court House with a blue plaque.
