= Chapel House, Twickenham =

House at 15 Montpelier Row, Twickenham, London

Coordinates: 51.450631°N 0.317402°W

15, Montpelier Row, Twickenham
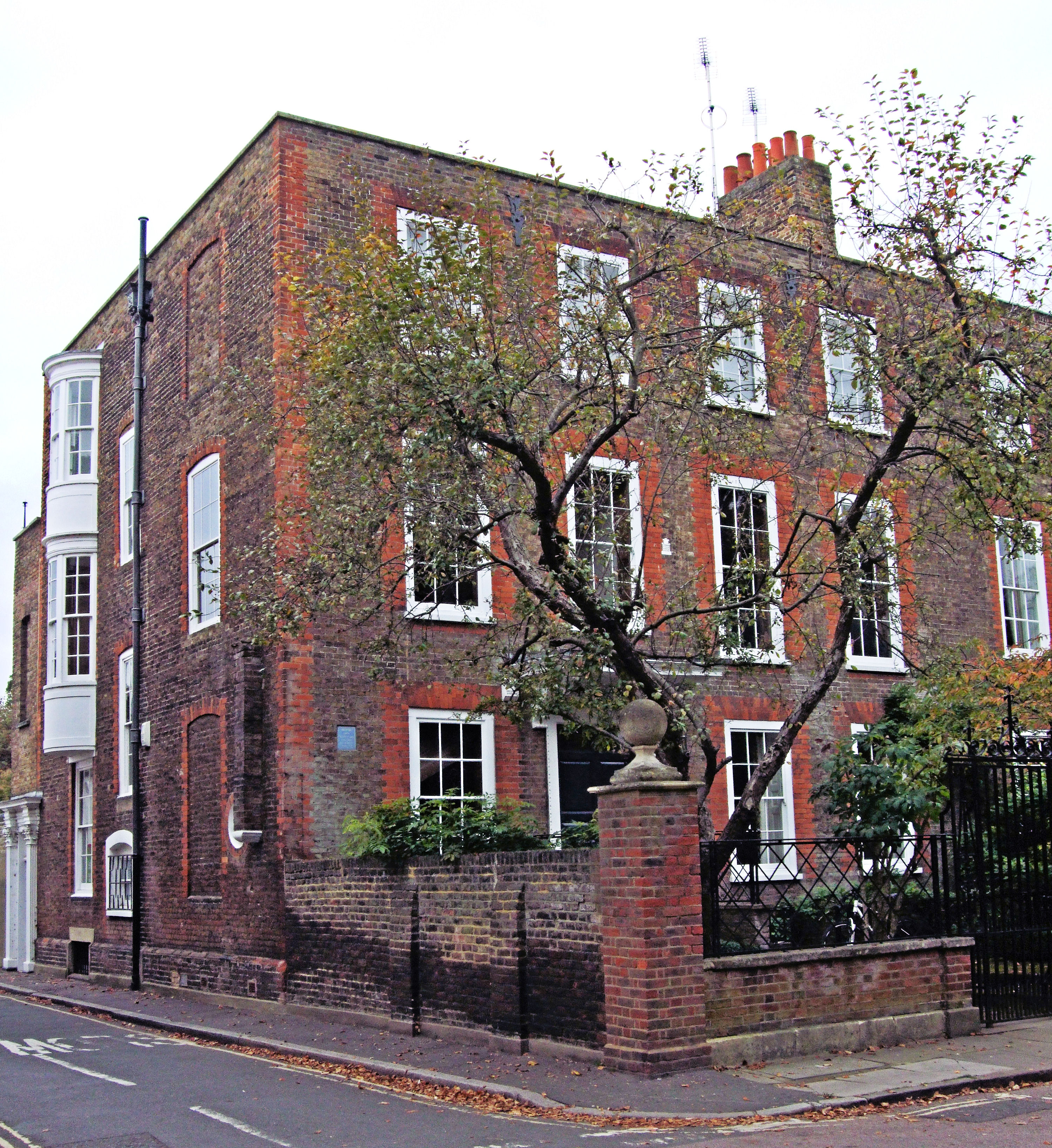
- Interactive map of the 15, Montpelier Row, Twickenham area
- Former names: Chapel House; Tennyson House; Holyrood House

General information
- Type: Three-storey house
- Architectural style: Early Georgian style
- Location: Twickenham, London, England
- Construction started: c. 1721
- Client: Retired naval officer Captain John Gray

Technical details
- Material: Brick

Listed Building – Grade II*
- Official name: Fotheringay House Tennyson House
- Designated: 2 September 1952
- Reference no.: 1285639

Chapel House, now No. 15, Montpelier Row, Twickenham, is a house in Greater London, England. The house has also been called Tennyson House and Holyrood House. It was occupied at one time by Alfred Tennyson, and poet Walter de la Mare lived in the same row nearly a hundred years later. The house was owned for many years by musician Pete Townshend, principal songwriter of the Who.

== Description ==
Chapel House is a three-storey brick house in early Georgian style, built in about 1721 for retired naval officer Captain John Gray. It takes its name from the private Montpelier Chapel built for Gray in about 1727. The chapel building was demolished after collapsing in 1941. The row features red window dressing and variations in doorways. The interior of No. 15 includes pine-panelled rooms and two carved wooden staircases. It has five thousand square feet of living space in the main house and a 150-foot (46 m)-long walled garden with a small cottage at the end. The cottage is thought to have been built around 1921 as an artist's studio.

== History ==
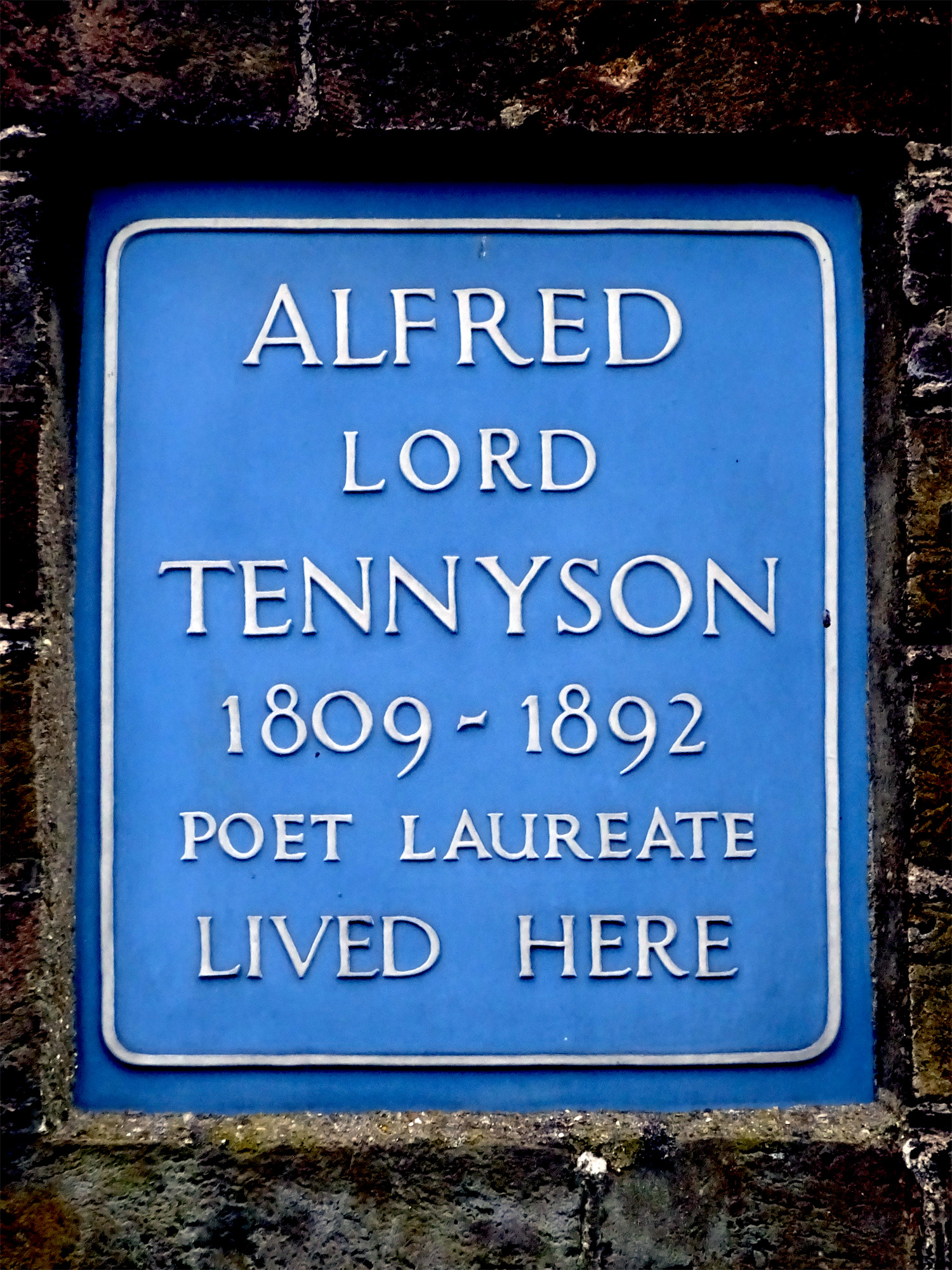
Tennyson plaque at 15 Montpelier Row

Alfred Tennyson and his family occupied Chapel House from 1851 to 1853. Tennyson first viewed the house in 1850, and he was disappointed to find it had already been let. He wrote in a letter:

"The most lovely house with a beautiful view in every room at top … A large staircase with great statues and carved and all rooms splendidly papered … and all for 50 guineas! A lady has taken it. I cursed my stars!"

Tennyson negotiated with the landlord and managed to rent the house in 1851, after all. His son Hallam was born in the house in 1852 and baptized at St Mary's Church, Twickenham. Tennyson also wrote “Ode on the Death of the Duke of Wellington”, published in 1852, while living at the house. After the Tennyson family moved to a more secluded location at Farringford in the Isle of Wight, Alfred's widowed mother Elizabeth moved into Chapel House.

Chapel House was bought in 1985 by Pete Townshend, and sold by his wife Karen Townshend in 2008 after the couple separated in the mid-1990s. The Townshends raised their children in the home, and Pete Townshend maintained a studio in the cottage on the property where he wrote and recorded songs. Townshend also filmed a music video for his album All the Best Cowboys Have Chinese Eyes at the house.

Karen Townshend made slight modifications to the house, removing cloak closets to open up the home and adding modern appliances to the kitchen. The house was seriously damaged by a fire during refurbishment in 2005. Although there was little interior fire damage, the panelling and wattle-and-daub ceilings suffered water damage which required restoration.

Because of its historical significance, Tennyson's residence at the house is commemorated by a blue plaque. The building is listed as Grade II* by Historic England.

== Other houses in the row ==
Joseph Skelton (1783–1871), an antiquarian and engraver, occupied Fotheringay House at No. 14, next door to Chapel House. Skelton published the Oxonia Antiqua Restaurata or Antiquities of Oxfordshire in 1823, containing over 170 engravings of scenes and buildings from Oxford.

The poet and writer Walter de la Mare (1873–1956) also occupied a house in the row from 1940 until his death in 1956. After the death of his wife, the writer took a flat in the top two stories of South End House, Montpelier Row. De la Mare was officially reprimanded for failing to comply with the blackout during World War II and, on one occasion, the police rowed across the river to warn that his upper windows were a beacon for the enemy.
