= Dysart Arms =

Pub in Petersham, London, England

The Dysart
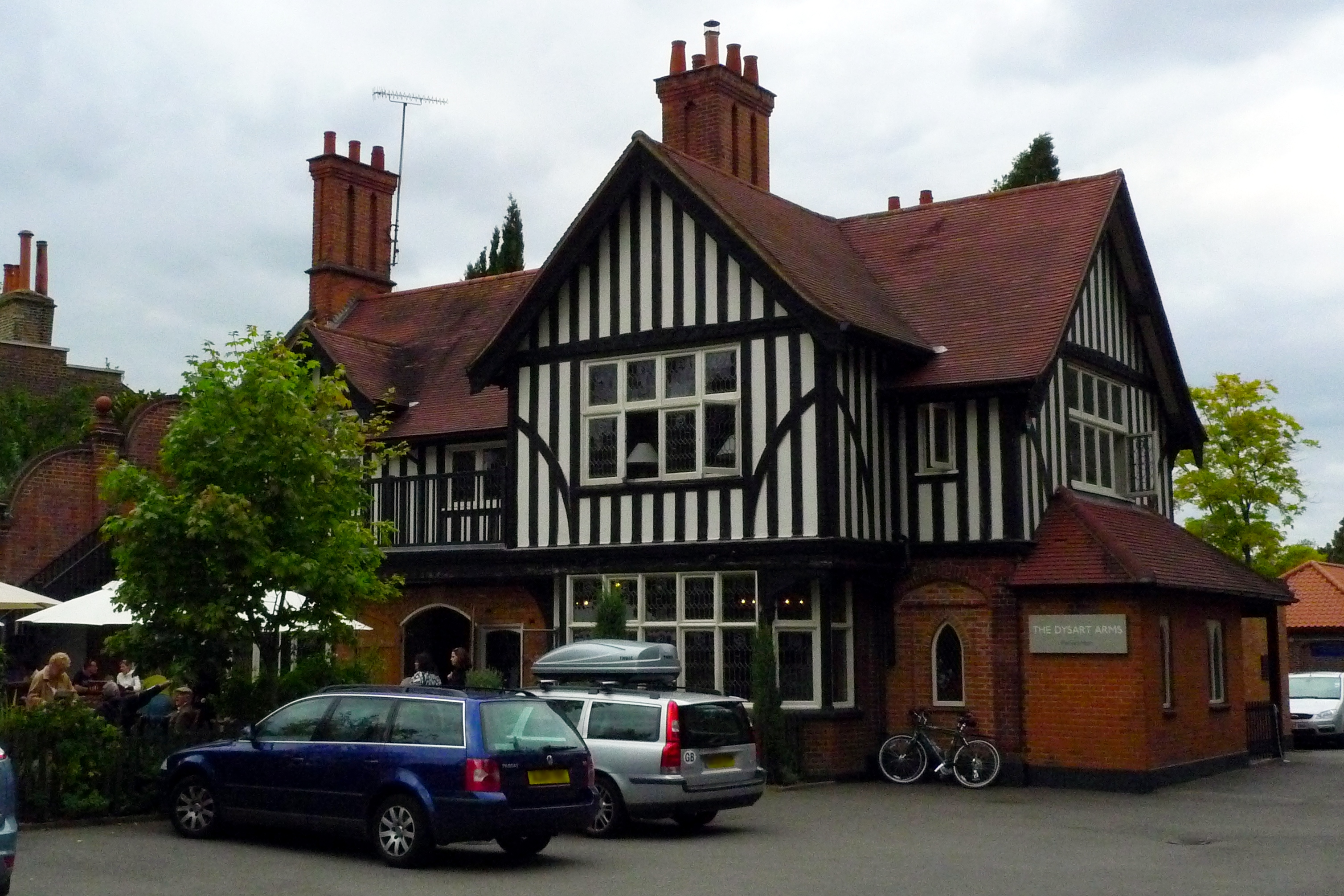
- The Dysart Arms, 2009

- Location within London Borough of Richmond upon Thames

Restaurant information
- Location: 135 Petersham Road, Petersham, TW10 7AA
- Coordinates: 51.446528°N 0.300233°W

The Dysart Arms is a former public house in Petersham, London. It is now a restaurant, The Dysart.

== Current building ==
The current building is in the Arts and Crafts style, and dates from 1904. The oak bar is not original to the pub, but had been bought in the 1850s from a decommissioned Napoleonic era warship.

== Etymology ==
The name refers to the arms of the Earls of Dysart, who held Ham House and the surrounding manors of Ham and Petersham for over three centuries, from their acquisition through close association with Charles I in the mid-17th century until the estate, including the Dysart Arms, was disposed of after World War II.

== History ==
The original building on the site was formerly a farmhouse dating from the second half of the 17th century. Previously known as the Plough and Harrow, unsubstantiated claims say that the name change was paid for by the Countess of Dysart in the 1830s. The building was demolished in 1902.

In 1836, Charles Dickens, a regular visitor to Petersham along with his friend John Forster, stayed there, probably at the Dysart Arms.

It is mentioned in the 1894 edition of Baedeker's London and Its Environs: Handbook for Travellers.
