= The Pavilion, Hampton Court =

Coordinates: 51°23′42″N 0°19′49″W

- Interactive map of the The Pavilion, Hampton Court area

General information
- Type: House
- Location: Barge Walk, Hampton Court, London Borough of Richmond upon Thames, England, United Kingdom

Design and construction
- Architect: William Talman
- Designations: Grade II*

Listed Building – Grade II*
- Official name: The Pavilion
- Designated: 2 September 1952
- Reference no.: 1080801

The Pavilion is a house on Barge Walk in Hampton Court Park near Hampton Court Palace. It is Grade II* listed on the National Heritage List for England. It is the sole survivor of four pavilions for the Bowling Green at Hampton Court.

It was designed by William Talman under the direction of Christopher Wren as part of William III's improvements to the palace. The house is set in 2.3 acres of gardens that include a parterre and water features.

The remaining 143-year lease of the Pavilion from the Crown Estate was for sale for £6.5 million in 2007. The Pavilion was again for sale in 2012; priced at £10 million.

Ernest Law, the historian of Hampton Court Palace, lived at the Pavilion until his death.

The pavilion was occupied by Cecil Harmsworth King and his second wife Ruth Railton in the 1960s and 1970s.

In 2019 a replica was built next to the original by R W Armstrong & Sons Ltd.

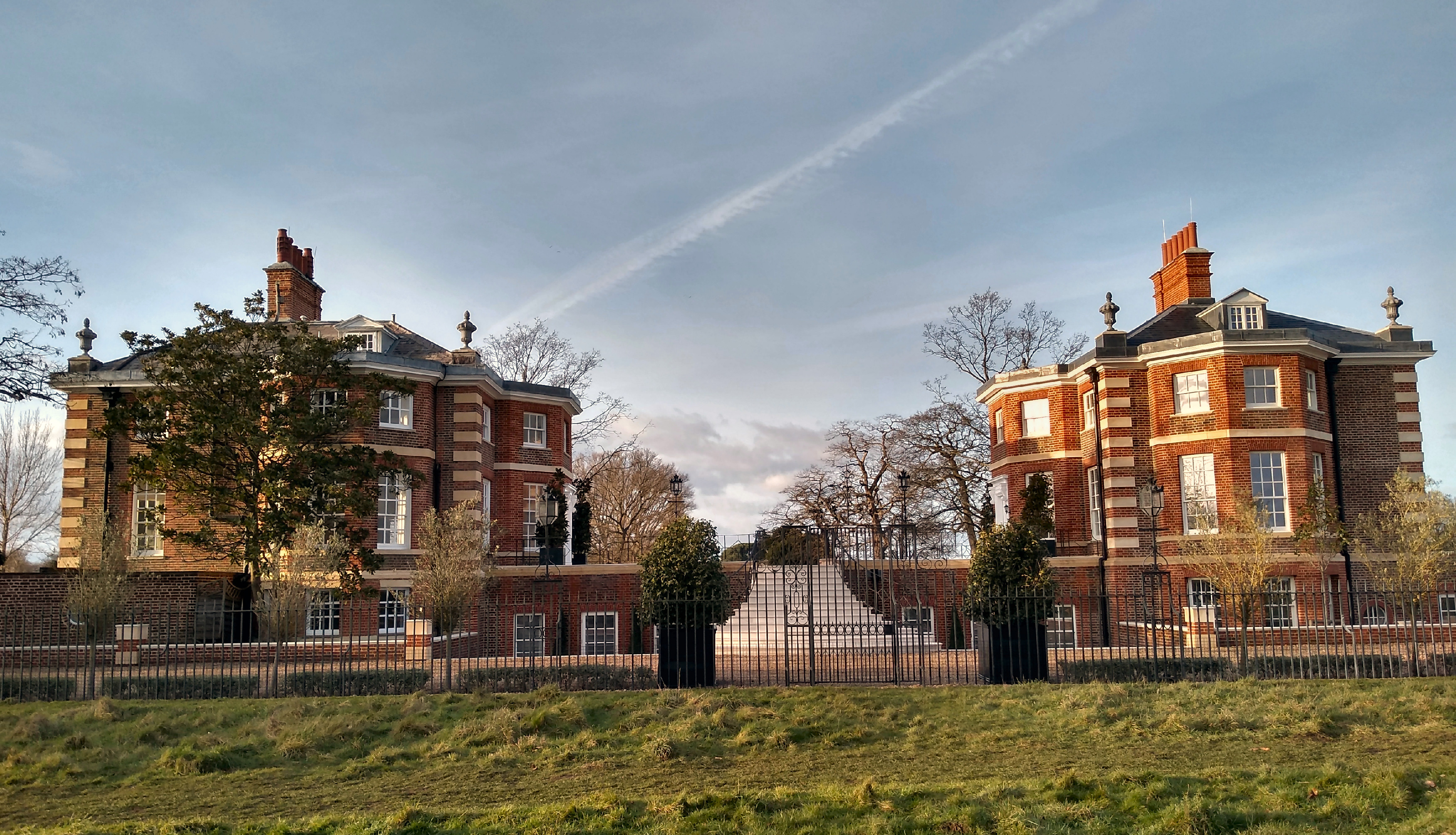
The Pavilion
