= Grove House, Hampton =

Coordinates: 51°25′00″N 0°21′29″W

Grove House
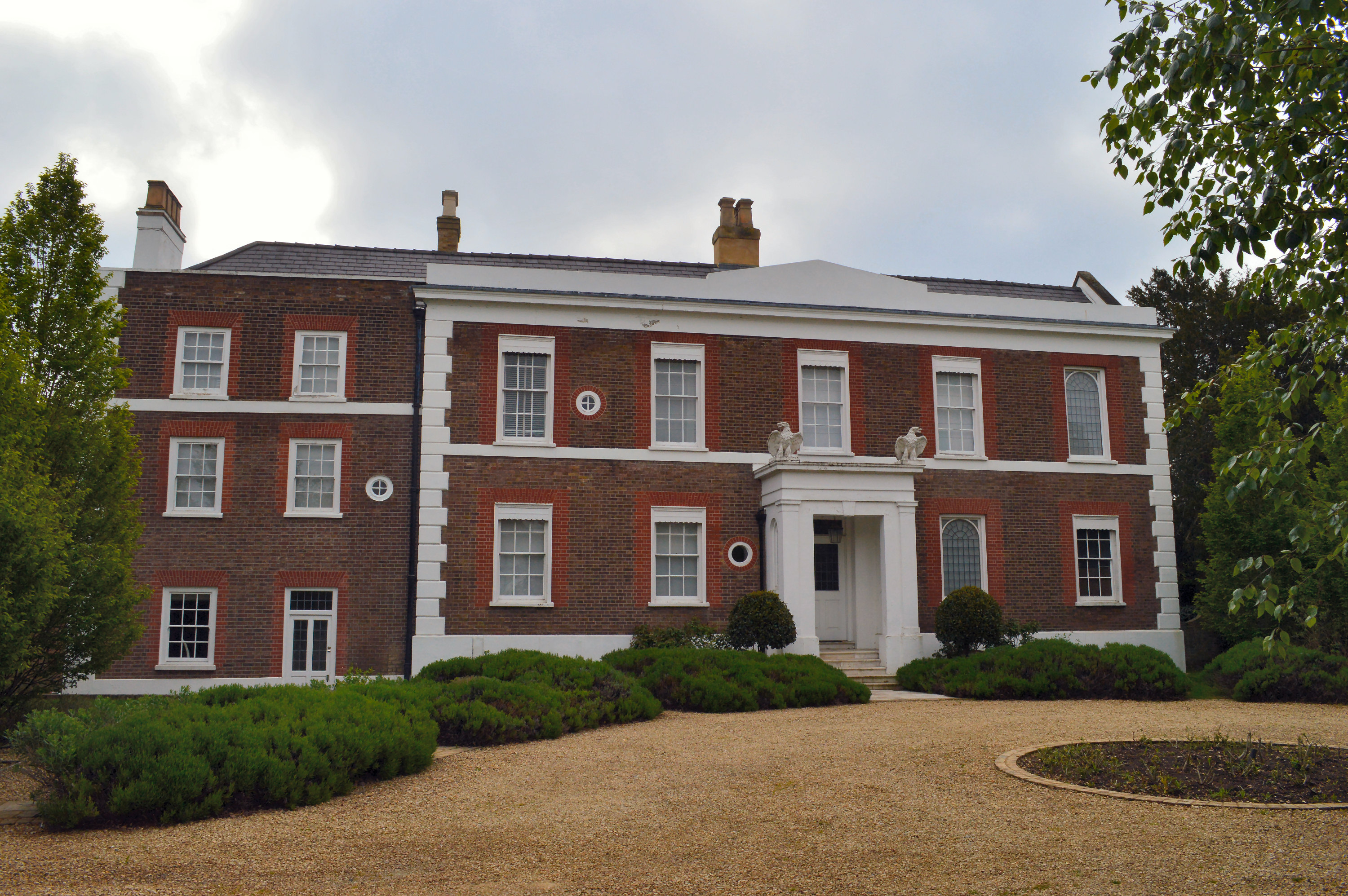
- Grove House
- Interactive map of the Grove House area
- Former names: Brick House

General information
- Type: House; converted into offices in 1966
- Location: 100 High Street, Hampton in the London Borough of Richmond upon Thames, England, United Kingdom
- Completed: Late 17th century

Listed Building – Grade II*
- Official name: Grove House
- Designated: 2 February 1952
- Reference no.: 1357703

Grove House is a Grade II* listed building at 100 High Street, Hampton in the London Borough of Richmond upon Thames. It dates from the late 17th century and in 1669 was called Brick House. Subsequently enlarged and remodelled, it was converted into offices in 1966.

Former residents include Sir Archibald Edmonstone, 1st Baronet, Sir Charles Edmonstone, 2nd Baronet, Edward Lapidge, Samuel Shuker and Charles James Stutfield.

== See also ==
- Grade II* listed buildings in Richmond upon Thames
