= Claud D. Grove and Berenice Sinclair Grove House =

Historic house in Missouri, United States

- U.S. National Register of Historic Places
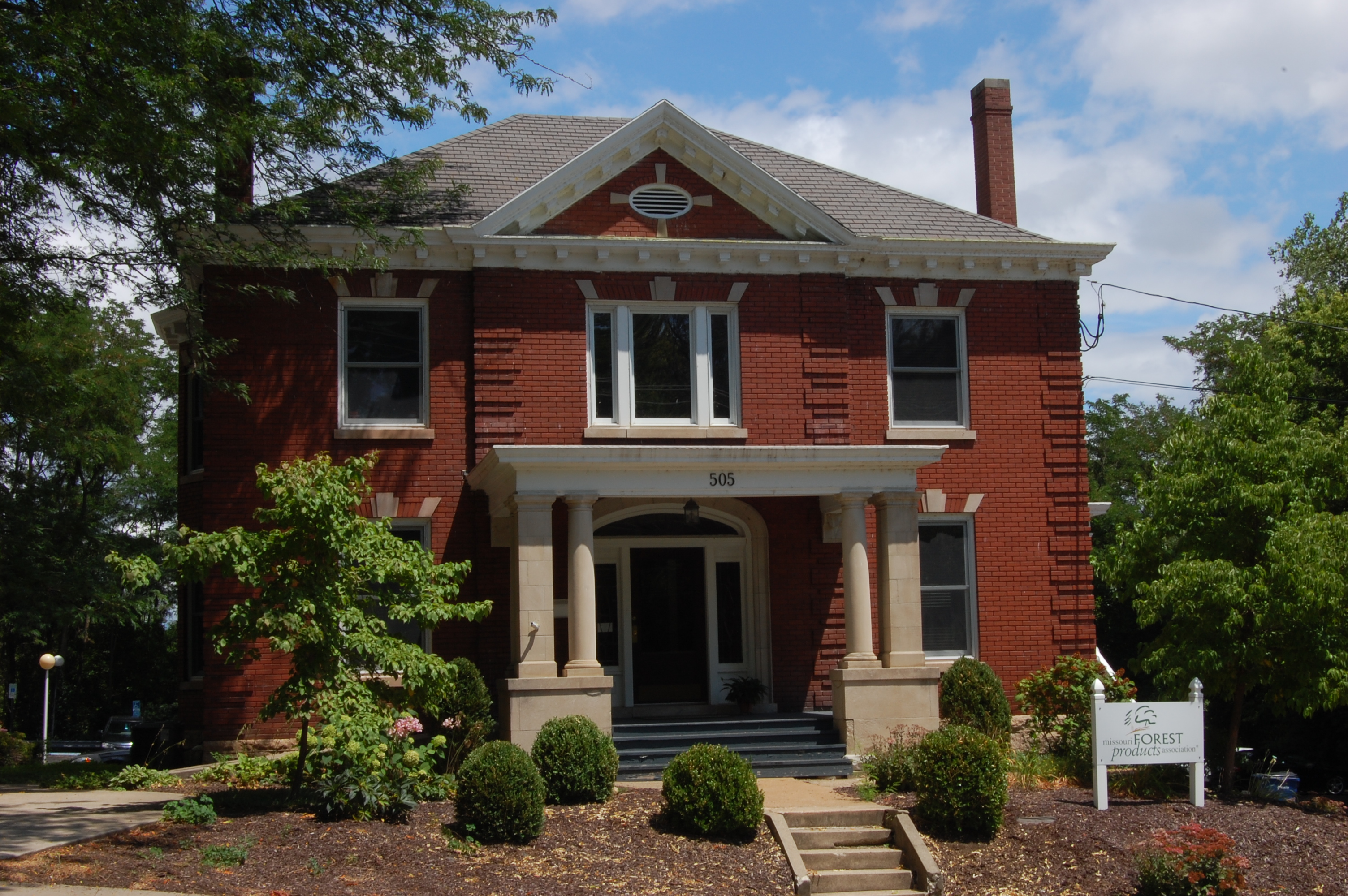
- Grove House, August 2014

- Location within Missouri Location within the United States
- Interactive map showing the location for Claud D. Grove and Berenice Sinclair Grove House
- Location: 505 E. State St., Jefferson City, Missouri
- Coordinates: 38°34′31″N 92°9′51″W
- Area: less than one acre
- Built: c. 1912
- Architectural style: Colonial Revival
- NRHP reference No.: 02001310
- Added to NRHP: November 15, 2002

Claud D. Grove and Berenice Sinclair Grove House, also known as the Hagener House and Edward G. Sinclair House , is a historic home located at Jefferson City, Cole County, Missouri. It was built about 1912, and is a two-story, Colonial Revival style brick dwelling with a projecting center gable. It has a slate hipped roof with shed dormer. It features a one-story front porch supported by one square and two round Tuscan order columns.

It was listed on the National Register of Historic Places in 2002.
