= Sudbrook Park, Petersham =

House and Park in Petersham, London

Sudbrook House
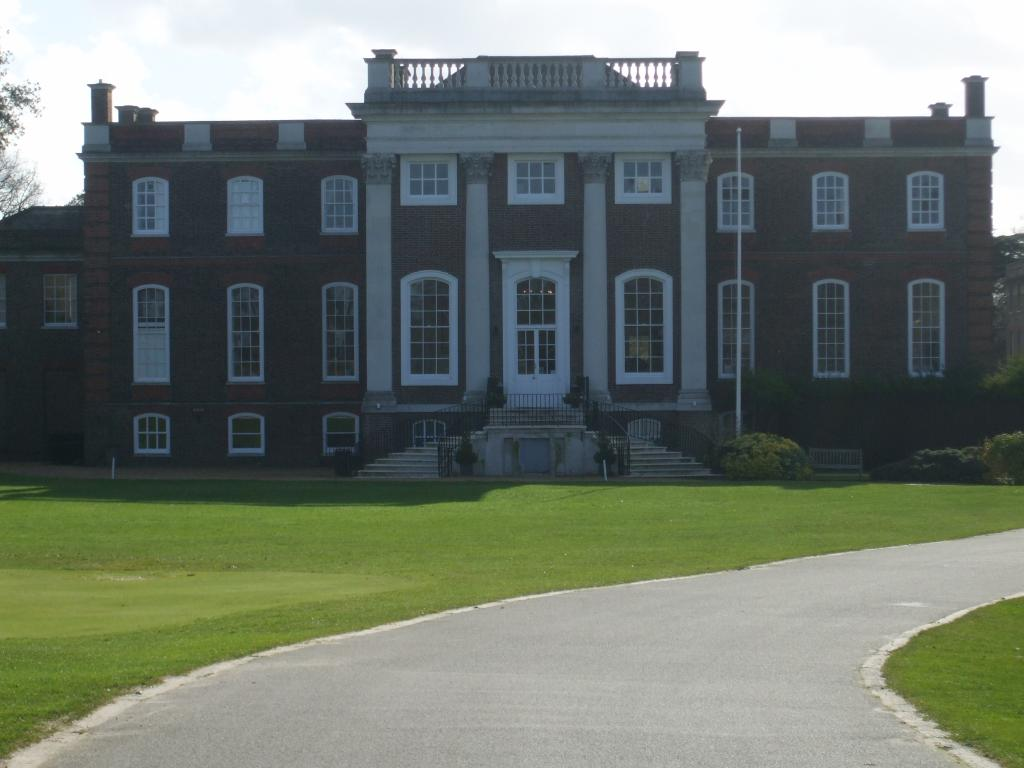
- Interactive map of the Sudbrook House area
- Alternative names: Sudbrooke House, Sudbrook Park

General information
- Architectural style: Palladian
- Location: Petersham, England, United Kingdom
- Coordinates: 51°26′23.2″N 0°17′49.6″W
- Construction started: 1726
- Completed: 1728
- Owner: Richmond Golf Club

Technical details
- Floor count: 2

Design and construction
- Architect: James Gibbs
- Designations: Grade I listed building

Listed Building – Grade I
- Official name: Richmond Golf Club Sudbrook Park
- Designated: 10 January 1950
- Reference no.: 1252877

Sudbrook Park in Petersham (now in the London Borough of Richmond upon Thames) was developed by John Campbell, 2nd Duke of Argyll in the early 18th century. Sudbrook House, designed for Argyll by James Gibbs and now Grade I listed by Historic England, is considered a fine example of Palladian architecture. The house and its surrounding park have been the home of the Richmond Golf Club since 1891.

== Sudbrook ==
Sudbrook takes its name from the stream Sudbrook (or South brook), that flows down from the adjacent hill through Ham and Petersham where it joins the River Thames.

Sudbrook is first recorded as a hamlet of Petersham in 1255. In 1266 "Gilbert de Suthbrok" and "Geoffrey de Suthbrok" were mentioned in the context of a dispute over endowment of the chaplain between the parishioners of Petersham and Merton Priory.

In 1550 there is record of a lawsuit as to the ownership of half a tenement called "Underhylle" and half a tenement called "Sudbrooke". These copyhold premises of the manor of Petersham, included a house and 30 acres (12 ha) of land, meadow, and pasture in Petersham.

At a court held in 1637 a customary cottage in Sudbrook, with a parcel of pasture and part of a close, was surrendered by Thomas Cole and John Yeates to the use of John Hewson and William Bell in payment of certain sums to the poor of Petersham, Ham, and West Sheen. About the same time Charles I enclosed Richmond Park. Nicholas Lane's 1632–1637 map shows that much of the area now associated with Sudbrook Park was amongst the few parts of the new park previously held by the crown; "Sudbrook", "Warren" and "Berrygrove".

== Sudbrook House and Park ==
=== The Argylls ===
John Campbell, 2nd Duke of Argyll was the eldest son of Archibald Campbell, 1st Duke of Argyll. His mother was Elizabeth Tollemache, daughter of Elizabeth, 2nd Countess of Dysart and Sir Lionel Tollemache, 3rd Baronet. He was born in his mother's family home Ham House nearby. Argyll pursued a military career from an early age and fought and deterred the Old Pretender’s troops at the battle of Sherrifmuir in 1715, thus consolidating George I's position as King.

Argyll began to purchase much of what became Sudbrook Park from 1712 onwards, firstly 20 acres (8.1 ha) of Petersham field, then, to the south, in 1715 17 acres (6.9 ha) of the former "Hatch Court", the earliest record of which dates from 1562 as part of the manor of Canbury. He was later granted a lease of 30 acres (12 ha) of adjacent land in Richmond Park by George II in 1726. James Gibbs was contracted to design a new home for Argyll and construction was completed by 1728.

The house consists of two square wings connected by a large central hall, on either side of which was a portico with Corinthian columns and balustraded parapet. The south portico was closed in later with brick walls built between the columns, and now serves as a smoking-room. The hall, now the dining-room known as the "cube room", extends the height of two stories; it has a marble fireplace with a bevelled mirror, over which are the Duke of Argyll's arms. The carved marble chimney is the work of Flemish sculptor, Jan Michiel Rysbrack. The walls are divided into panels by fluted Corinthian pilasters with a rich cornice, over which is a cove with circular lights and panels. The doorheads in the hall are carved with trophies of arms. The doorways in the later hall to the north of the large hall also have carved architraves and heads. There are stairs at both ends of the building with twisted balusters, etc. A double flight of stone steps leads up to both main entrances. A later wing, connected to the main house by a long narrow passage, extends to the northwards, east of it. An arched lodge stands at the entrance to the park to the north of the house.

Argyll and his second wife, Jane Warburton, had four daughters that survived to adulthood but no male heirs. The annex to the west of the house is known as "the Young Ladies House" and was built for them.

=== Caroline Campbell and the Buccleuch family ===
Argyll died at Sudbrook in 1743. The title and other property passed to his brother, Archibald Campbell, 3rd Duke of Argyll. Sudbrook passed to his eldest daughter and co-heir Lady Caroline Campbell.

Caroline married Francis Scott, Earl of Dalkeith, eldest son and heir apparent of Francis Scott, 2nd Duke of Buccleuch. Caroline extended the estate by purchasing additional land from the crown in 1784.

Lord Dalkeith died in April 1750, before his father. Caroline remarried Charles Townshend and was widowed again in 1767. Caroline was created Baroness of Greenwich in 1786. She resided at Sudbrook until her death on 11 January 1794, aged 76.

The estate descended to Dalkeith's son, Henry Scott, 3rd Duke of Buccleuch. Henry died at Dalkeith Palace, Midlothian, Scotland, on 11 January 1812, aged 65 and ownership of Sudbrook passed to Charles Montagu-Scott, 4th Duke of Buccleuch and Queensberry. On his death in 1819 the family sold the Sudbrook estate. A copy of the sale catalogue dated 3 August 1819 survives in the archives at Boughton House.

=== 19th century ===
The property was purchased by Sir Robert Wilmot-Horton, 3rd Baronet who died at Sudbrook in 1841.

In 1844 Dr Weiss, then Dr James Ellis, established a hydropathy clinic at Sudbrook Park, which ran for about twenty years. Ellis faced a charge of manslaughter in 1846 when a patient died following the cold water-treatment but the charge was dropped. Charles Darwin was amongst the clients, visiting Sudbrook in 1860.

In 1853 the Crown Estate repurchased the freehold, and the lease was held by The Richmond Golf Club from 1891. A private hotel operated at the site from 1886. In March 2016 the freehold was sold by The Crown Estate to The Richmond Golf Club Limited, and the golf club continues there to this day.

=== 20th century: listing ===
In 1950 the house was designated as a Grade I listed building.

== Sudbrook Lodge and Sudbrook Cottage ==
The James Gibbs house in Sudbrook Park is and was sometimes referred to as Sudbrook Lodge, yet, confusingly, this name is also held by a different, 17th-century, Grade II listed building, situated nearby on the A307 road at Ham Common. Rebuilt in about 1680 by Elizabeth Wigington, daughter of Thomas Hunt, a timber merchant, the property was reputedly occupied at one time by Nell Gwynn around the time of the birth of Charles II's illegitimate son, Charles Beuclerk, though that would have pre-dated the building's reconstruction. Wigington's descendants sold land to the north to the Argylls which became the kitchen garden of the park, more recently developed as a small residential area called Sudbrook Close. The Wigington family also developed a terrace of cottages to the east, towards Ham Gate, one of which, Sudbrook Cottage was, for many years, the residence of writer, playwright and public speaker Beverley Nichols. Sudbrook Lodge was the home of the Scottish writer Sir Compton Mackenzie, OBE (1883 – 1972) during World War II.
