= Richmond Golf Club =

Golf club in London Borough of Richmond upon Thames, England

The Richmond Golf Club
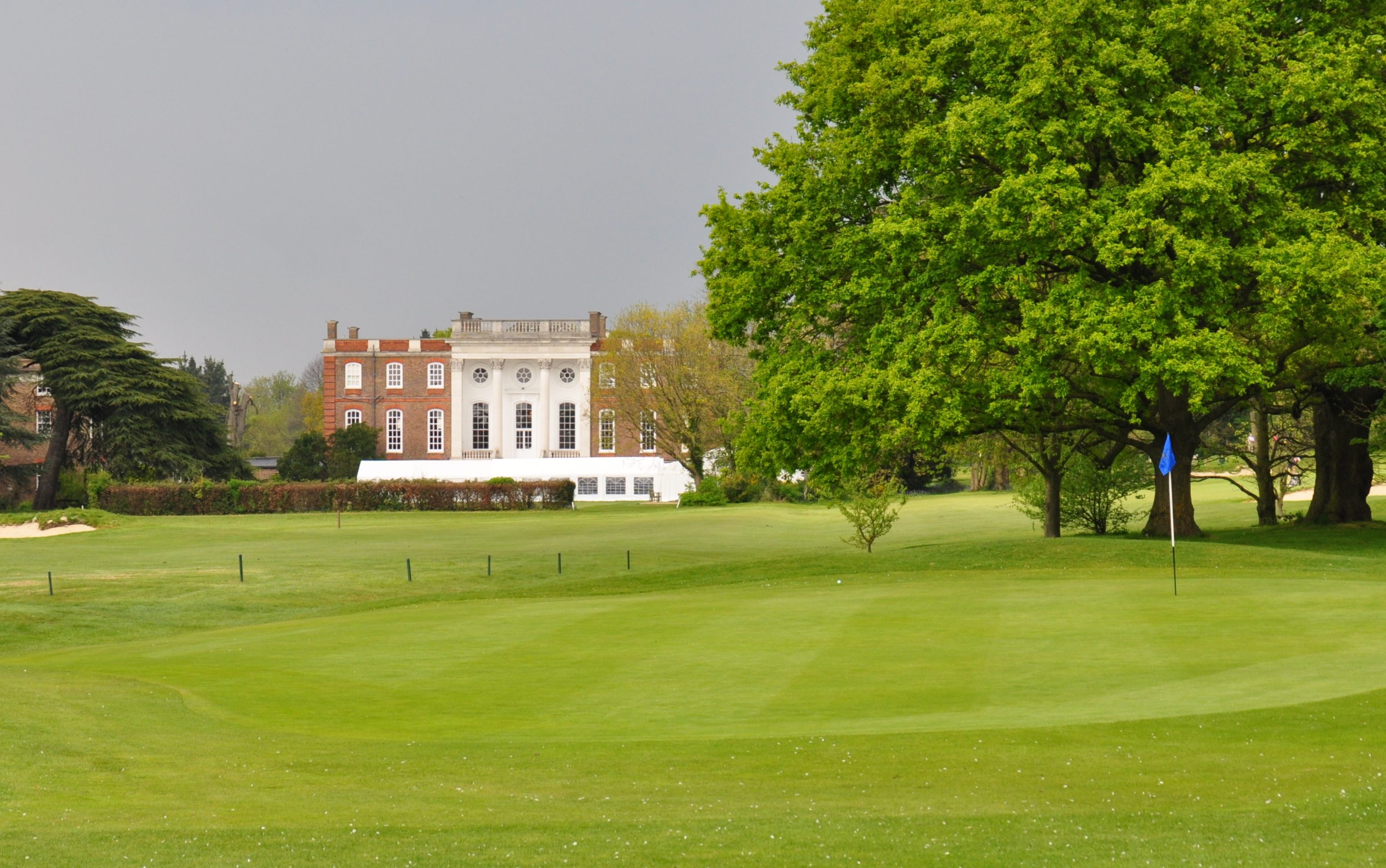
- Sudbrook House and the 8th Green

- The Richmond Golf Club
- 51°26′23.36″N 0°17′49.48″W

Club information
- Location: Petersham
- Established: 1891
- Type: private
- Owner: The Richmond Golf Club Limited
- Tota holes: 18
- Tournaments: The Don Memorial Challenge Cup (Open)
- Website: http://www.therichmondgolfclub.com
- Designed by: Tom Dunn
- Par: 70
- Length: 6,091 yards (5,570 m)

The Richmond Golf Club is a private golf club whose 18-hole course now occupies the historic Sudbrook Park adjacent to Richmond Park, in Petersham, south west London. The Grade I listed building Sudbrook House is now the clubhouse.

== History ==
The Club was founded in February 1891, at a meeting at the Greyhound Hotel in Richmond. It briefly leased a course at Old Deer Park, before moving to Sudbrook Park in Petersham, where it has been located ever since.

Without a clubhouse initially, the members met in the Fox and Duck public house, which they also used for the changing rooms, before obtaining the lease of Sudbrook Park and House in 1898.

German bombs fell on the course in 1940. The club made temporary rules to accommodate this.

== Golfing and competitions ==
The club runs a full schedule of friendly and competitive golfing activities. It still runs competitions dating back to the first days of the club, of which notable competitions include:

- The Stephenson Challenge Cup trophies, first presented in 1895 to the winners of the singles and foursomes matchplay competitions.
- The Don Memorial Challenge Cup, instituted in 1895, a 36-hole scratch medal which is open to members of invited local golf clubs.
- The Victory and Rube Shields, a series of annual matches played between the Club and the Royal Mid-Surrey Golf Club, first played in 1897.

The club has hosted visits from many professionals including, in 1975, Tom Watson playing his first game of golf in Britain. This was the day before playing in and winning his first Open Championship at Carnoustie, beating Jack Newton in a play-off.

== Course ==
The course was designed by Tom Dunn in 1896, one of many laid out by him during the explosion of popularity of the sport in the late 19th century.

The current layout of the course consists of six par 3, eight par 4 and four par 5 holes, with a total length of 6,091 yards (5,570 m) and a par of 70 (SSS 69).

Between 2010 and 2012, the course underwent significant renovation, including the construction of 56 new bunkers, as well as improvements to putting greens, tees and the planting of new trees along the fairways. Following these enhancements, the course was awarded first place in the Golf Inc. Monthly, Renovation of the Year for 2012.

== Clubhouse ==
The club's clubhouse, Sudbrook House, was built around 1725 by architect James Gibbs, for John Campbell, 2nd Duke of Argyll. It is built of a combination of white Portland stone and dark red brick, and is widely regarded as one of the finest examples of early eighteenth-century English Palladian architecture.

At the centre of Sudbrook House is The Cube Room, which is the club's principal dining and function room. The Cube Room is of Baroque style, and as its name suggests, the height (over 30 feet) is the same as the width and length. The interior of The Cube Room is adorned with trophies of arms above the doorways from the Duke of Argyll's military achievements, and the Campbell family coat of arms carved in pine in the great panel above the mirror. The carved marble chimney is the work of Flemish sculptor Jan Michiel Rysbrack.

== Other facilities ==
In addition to the course, there are extensive practice facilities, including: 2 putting greens, a 250-yard driving range with covered teaching bays, and a short-game practice area for chipping and bunker shots.

The clubhouse has two bars, one which is reserved exclusively for members, dining rooms, and a TV lounge.

The course also has a pro shop and the clubhouse is available to host weddings and other social events.

== See also ==
- Richmond Park Golf Club
- Royal Mid-Surrey Golf Club
