= Rutland Lodge =

House in Petersham, London

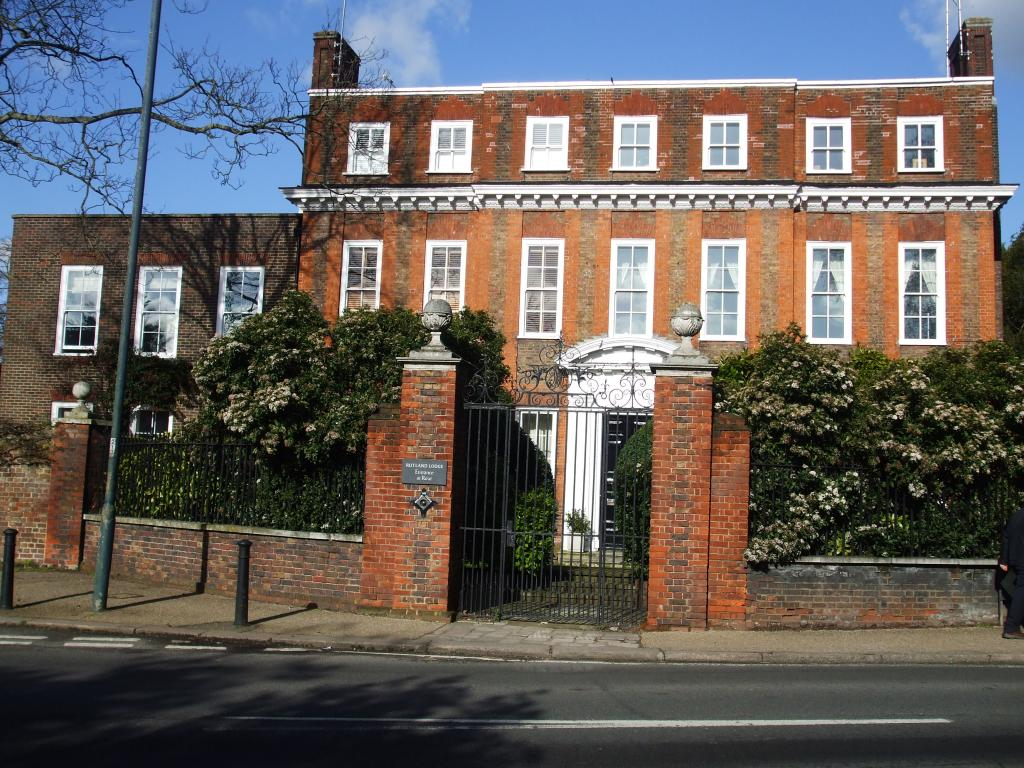

General information
- Location: Petersham, London, England
- Coordinates: 51.4463°N 0.3032°W
- Completed: late 17th century

Listed Building – Grade II*
- Official name: Rutland Lodge
- Designated: 10 January 1950
- Reference no.: 1065338

Rutland Lodge is a late-17th century house in Petersham in the London Borough of Richmond upon Thames. The house and its entrance gate and piers are Grade II* listed.

The house was possibly built by Sir Robert Jenner. Its first occupant was Sir John Darnall, a London lawyer. The house's current name commmemorates Lucy Manners, Duchess of Rutland who lived at the house from 1741 to 1751 while it was under the ownership of Sir William Yongue. After a fire destroyed much of the interior in 1967, the building was converted into flats.
