= Montrose House =

Coordinates: 51.4460°N 0.3027°W

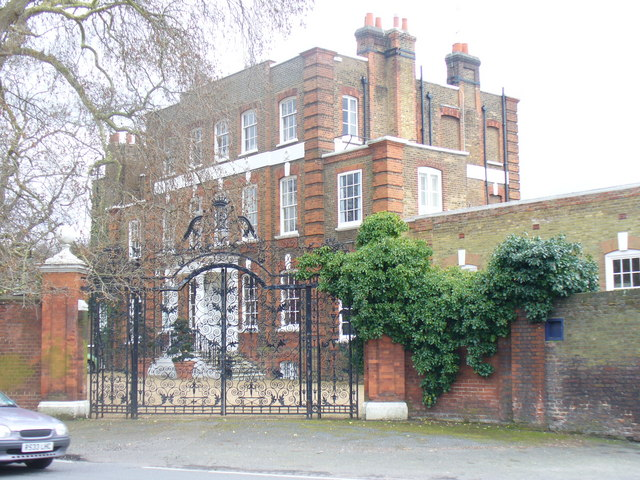
- Interactive map of the Montrose House area

General information
- Type: Residential
- Location: Petersham, London Borough of Richmond upon Thames, England
- Construction started: late 17th century

Listed Building – Grade II*
- Official name: Montrose House
- Designated: 25 June 1983
- Reference no.: 1065342

Montrose House is a late 17th-century Grade II* listed building at 186 Petersham Road, Petersham in the London Borough of Richmond upon Thames.

Sir Thomas Jenner was the first resident. In the 1870s it was occupied by John Master, a retired magistrate from the Indian Colonial Service, his wife Gertrude, and his children. One of his daughters, Hilda Master, went on to become the mother of Sir Anthony Blunt. Tommy Steele was also an owner; he then sold the house in about 2004.

== Montrose House in art ==
A drawing of the rear of Montrose House was made by Wilfred Fairclough in July 1941 as part of "Recording Britain". It is held at the Victoria and Albert Museum.
