= Petersham, London =

Coordinates: 51°26′42″N 0°18′11″W

Petersham
- Village
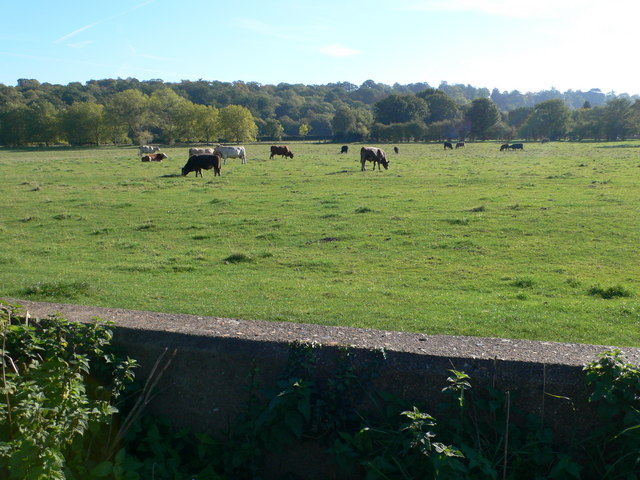
- Cattle grazing in Petersham Meadows

- Location within Greater London
- Population: 10,317 (2011 Census. Ham, Petersham and Richmond Riverside Ward)
- OS grid reference: TQ179733
- London borough: Richmond
- Ceremonial county: Greater London
- Region: London
- Country: England
- Sovereign state: United Kingdom
- Post town: RICHMOND
- Postcode district: TW10
- Dialling code: 020
- Police: Metropolitan
- Fire: London
- Ambulance: London
- UK Parliament: Richmond Park
- London Assembly: South West

Petersham is a village in the London Borough of Richmond upon Thames on the east of the bend in the River Thames south of Richmond, which it shares with neighbouring Ham. It provides the foreground of the scenic view from Richmond Hill across Petersham Meadows, with Ham House further along the river. Other nearby places include Twickenham, Isleworth, Teddington, Mortlake, and Roehampton.

== History ==
Petersham appears in Domesday Book (1086) as Patricesham. It was held by Chertsey Abbey. Its assets were: 4 hides; 1 church, 5 ploughs, 1 fishery worth 1,000 eels and 1000 lampreys, 3 acres (1.2 ha) of meadow. It rendered £6 10s 0d.

Archibald Campbell, later 3rd Duke of Argyll and Earl of Islay, was born at Ham House in 1682. He went on to found the Royal Bank of Scotland in Edinburgh in 1727.

The explorer George Vancouver retired to Petersham, where he wrote A Voyage Of Discovery to the North Pacific Ocean, and Round the World. He lived in a house in River Lane that is now two separate dwellings – Navigator's House (formerly known as Craigmyle Cottage) and Glen Cottage. He died in 1798 and is buried in the churchyard of Petersham Parish Church. The Portland stone monument over his grave, renovated in the 1960s, is now Grade II listed in view of its historical associations.

In 1839 Charles Dickens rented Elm Cottage, renamed Elm Lodge, where he wrote Nicholas Nickleby.

In 1847 Queen Victoria granted Pembroke Lodge in the Petersham part of Richmond Park to John Russell, 1st Earl Russell, and it became the Russell family home. Lord Russell's grandson, Bertrand Russell, spent some of his childhood there. During World War II the GHQ Liaison Regiment (also known as Phantom) established its regimental headquarters nearby at the Richmond Hill Hotel, with its base (including the officers' mess and billet) at Pembroke Lodge.

In the early 19th century, Charles Stanhope, styled Lord Petersham, later Earl of Harrington, gave the Petersham name to a type of greatcoat. In 1955 Petersham also gave its name to HMS Petersham, which was a Ham-class minesweeper.

== Governance ==
Petersham is part of the Richmond Park constituency for elections to the House of Commons of the United Kingdom. It is part of the Ham, Petersham and Richmond Riverside ward for elections to Richmond upon Thames London Borough Council.

On 1 April 1965 the civil parish was abolished. At the 1951 census (one of the last before the abolition of the parish), Petersham had a population of 1134.

== Landmarks ==
=== Notable buildings ===
Listed buildings include a watchman's box that also served as a village lock-up and dates from 1787.

Petersham Road (part of the A307) includes an extremely sharp right-angled bend edged by a pair of handsome wrought iron gates. This is the entrance to Montrose House, one of the most notable houses in Petersham. After a spate of serious accidents on the bend in the road, the neighbours formed a group in the 1850s called Trustees of the Road. The Hon. Algernon Tollemache of Ham House was their leader and they managed to persuade the owner of Montrose House to part with some land to reduce the sharpness of the bend. But various dents in the brick wall today reveal that motorists are still taken unawares by it.

Adjacent to Montrose House and equally as impressive is Rutland Lodge, built in 1666 for a Lord Mayor of London; it is Grade II* listed.

Another historic house in Petersham is Douglas House, just off the west drive to Ham House. One of its notable inhabitants was Catherine, Duchess of Queensberry. In 1969 it was bought by the Federal Republic of Germany for use as a German school. New buildings have been erected in the grounds, but the original house and stables have been preserved.

== Transport ==
Petersham is served by only two bus routes: the 65 and 371, both linking the village with Richmond and Kingston upon Thames. It has only a few bus stops such as Sandy Lane, Sudbrook Lane (The Russell School) and Ham Street and The Dysart.

== Education ==
Deutsche Schule (DSL), London (the German School London), is based at Douglas House. The Russell School, now on Petersham Road, was founded in 1851 by Lord John Russell, who served twice as Britain's Prime Minister; it was originally located in Richmond Park, near Petersham Gate, but the building was irreparably damaged by a bomb in 1943 and demolished. Sudbrook School is a nursery school housed in Petersham's village hall on Bute Avenue.

== Religious sites ==
=== St Peter's Church ===
Petersham Parish Church is believed to pre-date the Norman conquest of England, as a church at Petersham is mentioned in Domesday Book (1086).

=== All Saints' Church ===
All Saints', on Bute Avenue, was built as a church but was never consecrated. It was built between 1899 and 1909 by Leeds architect John Kelly for Mrs Rachael Warde (née Walker) (1841–1906) as a memorial to her father Samuel Walker and her aunt Ellen Walker. During World War II it was used as an Anti-Aircraft Command post and it has also been used as a recording studio and as a filming location. It is now a private residence.

== Sport ==
Richmond Golf Club, a private golf club, is situated in the historic Sudbrook Park, adjacent to Richmond Park; the Grade I listed building Sudbrook House, in the park, has been its clubhouse since 1898. Ham and Petersham Cricket Club, whose home matches are played in Ham, was established in 1815. Ranelagh Harriers running club is based behind The Dysart restaurant.

== Notable people ==
=== Living people ===
- Shirley Bloomer (born 1934), who won three Grand Slam tennis titles during her tennis-playing career, is the widow of Chris Brasher (see Historical figures below); they brought up their family in Petersham.
- Fearne Cotton (born 1981), TV presenter, lived at Chestnut Cottage, Petersham from 2004 to 2008.
- Michael Frayn (born 1933), playwright and novelist, and his wife Claire Tomalin (born 1933), journalist and biographer, live in Petersham.
- The entertainer Tommy Steele (born 1936) bought Montrose House in 1969. He sold it in about 2004.
- Lynne Truss (born 1955), author, journalist, novelist, and radio broadcaster and dramatist, grew up in Petersham.
- Peter Voser (born 1958), the former CEO of Royal Dutch Shell, lived in Petersham. He has since moved back to his native Switzerland.

=== Historical figures ===
- Daisy Ashford (1881–1972), who is most famous for writing The Young Visiters, was born at Elm Lodge, Petersham.
- Chris Brasher (1928–2003), an athlete and sports journalist who co-founded the London Marathon, lived in River Lane, Petersham.
- The author and illustrator Charles George Harper (1863–1943) lived in Petersham in later life, and died there in 1943.
- Lodowick Carlell (1602–1675), courtier and playwright, and his wife Joan Carlile (c.1606–1679), portrait painter, lived at Petersham Lodge in Richmond Park. They are buried together in St Peter's churchyard, but the location of their grave is not known.
- Major Herbert Byng Hall (1805–1883) was an officer in the British Army and later a Queen's Messenger who wrote several books on travel, sport and food, as well as two novels. He lived at Rose Cottage, River Lane, from about 1859 to 1878. His wife is buried at St Peter's church.
- Prince Rupert Loewenstein (1933–2014), aristocrat, merchant banker and longtime financial manager of The Rolling Stones, lived at Petersham Lodge in River Lane, a former grace-and-favour mansion, purchased for about £2 million in 1987. It is an early 18th-century house, built for Catherine Douglas, Duchess of Queensberry, and Grade II listed by Historic England.
- The businessman Tony Rampton (1915–1993), who was chairman of the clothing retailer Freemans, lived at Gort Lodge, an early 18th-century Grade II listed house in Petersham, where he and his wife Joan, who were both philanthropists, brought up their family, including their son Richard Rampton KC (1941–2023), who became a libel lawyer. Tony and Joan Rampton are buried in St Peter's churchyard.
- George Vancouver (1757–1798), Captain in the Royal Navy and one of Britain's greatest explorers and navigators, retired to Petersham and lived on River Lane; he is buried in St Peter's churchyard.
- Sir Robert Wilmot-Horton (1784–1841), politician, sociopolitical theorist and colonial administrator, who was Under-Secretary of State for War and the Colonies between 1821 and 1828, and Governor of Ceylon from 1831 to 1837, lived and died at Sudbrook Park, Petersham.

== Gallery ==
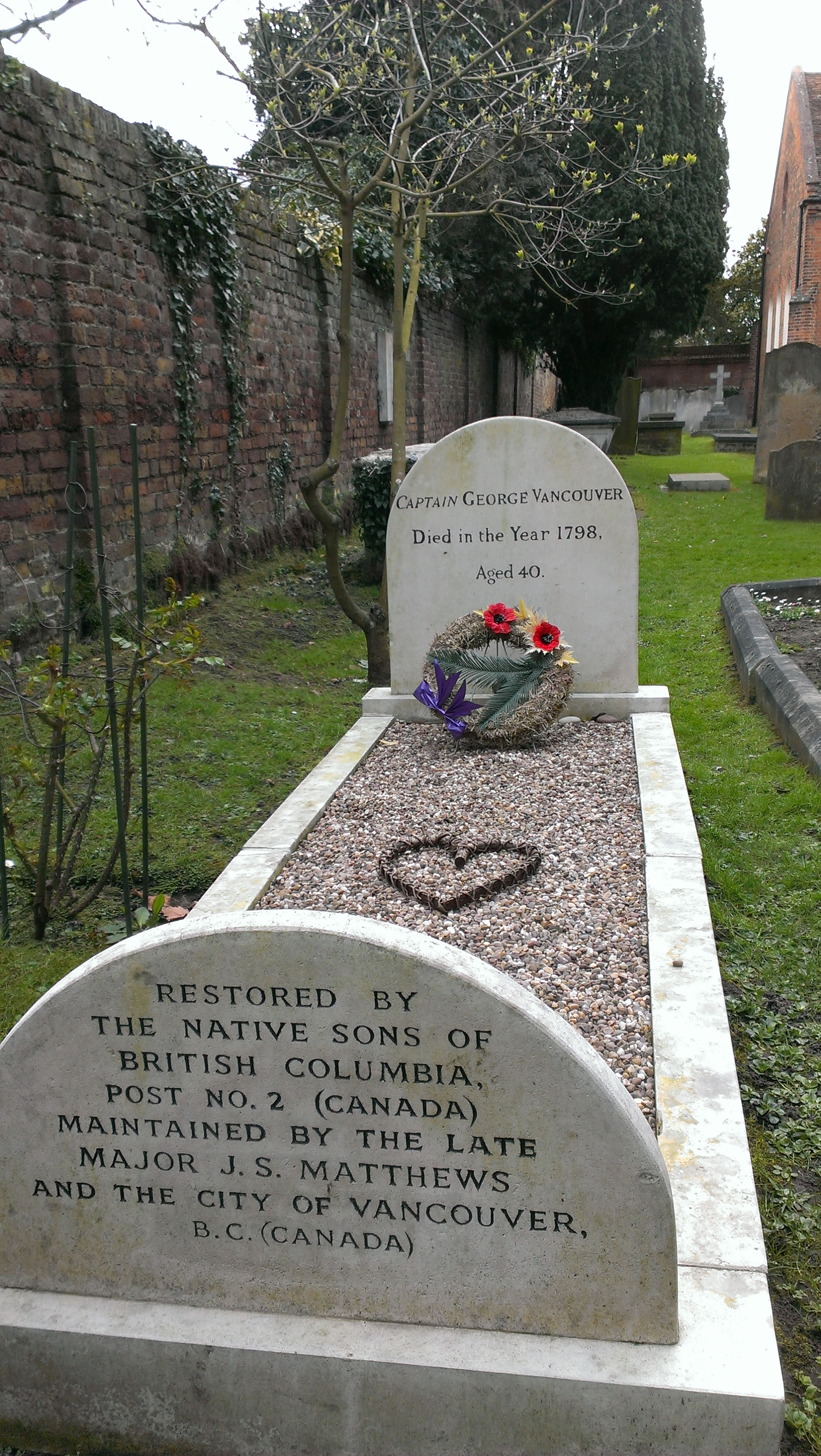
Grave of the explorer George Vancouver

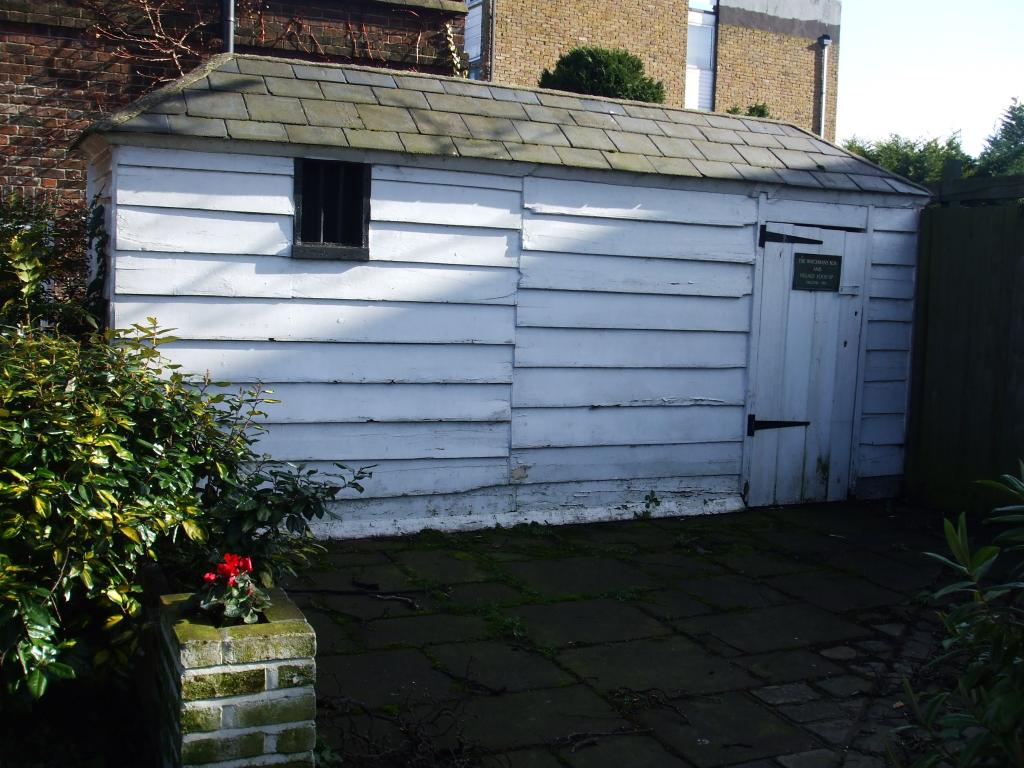
Watchman's hut and lock-up, erected in 1787 and now Grade II listed

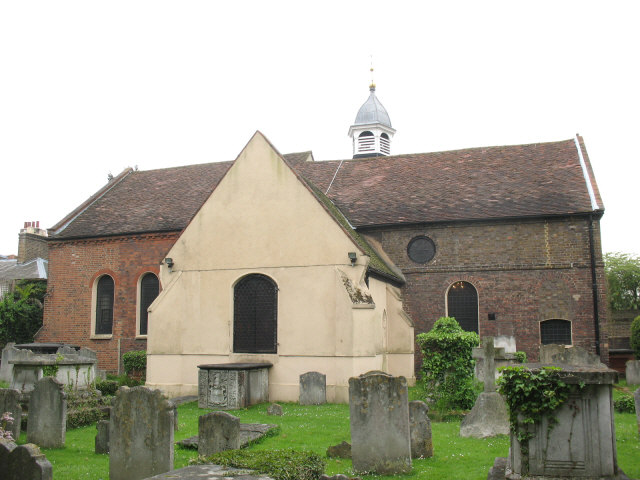
St Peter's Parish Church

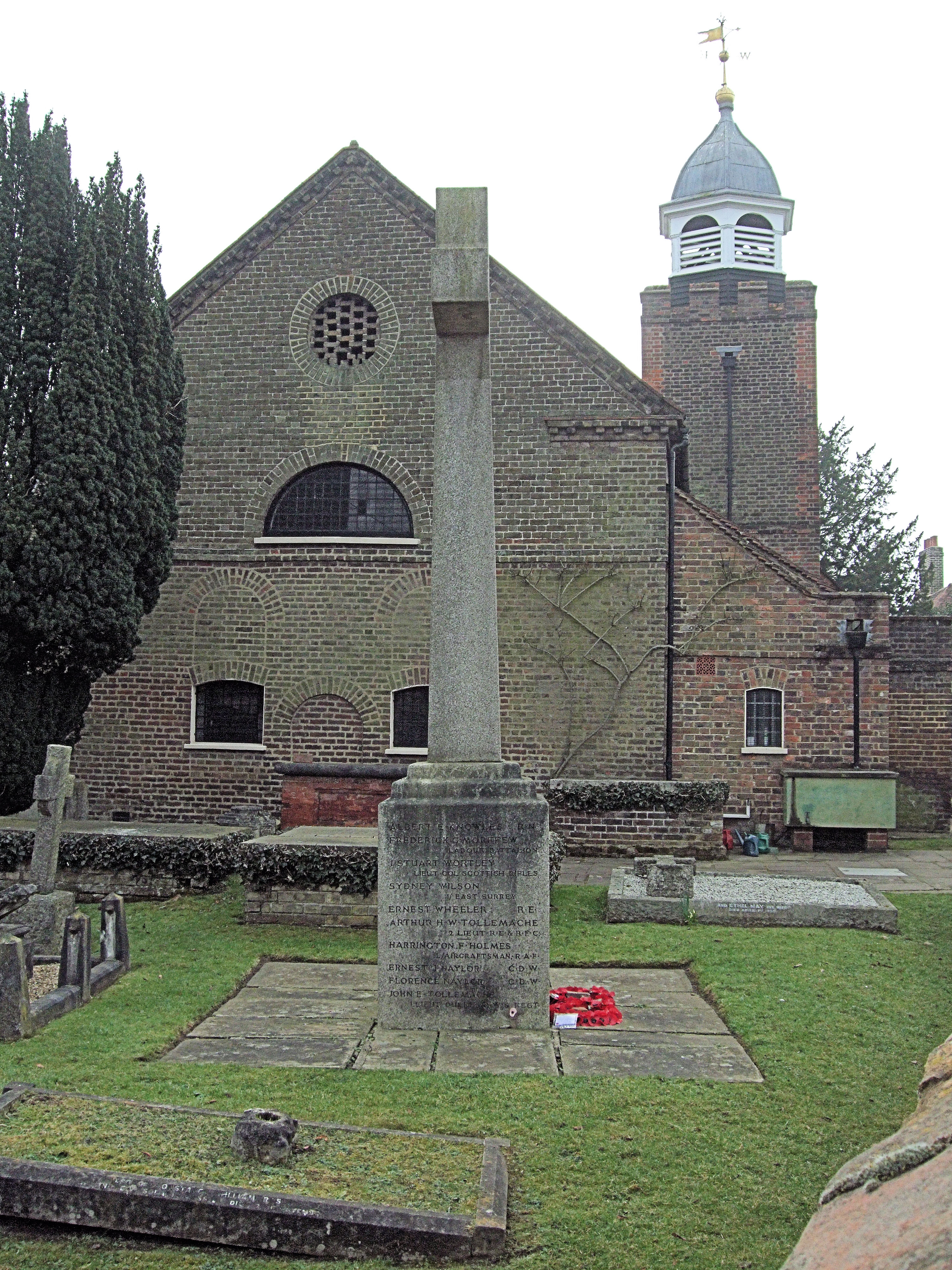
Petersham War Memorial in the churchyard of St Peter's

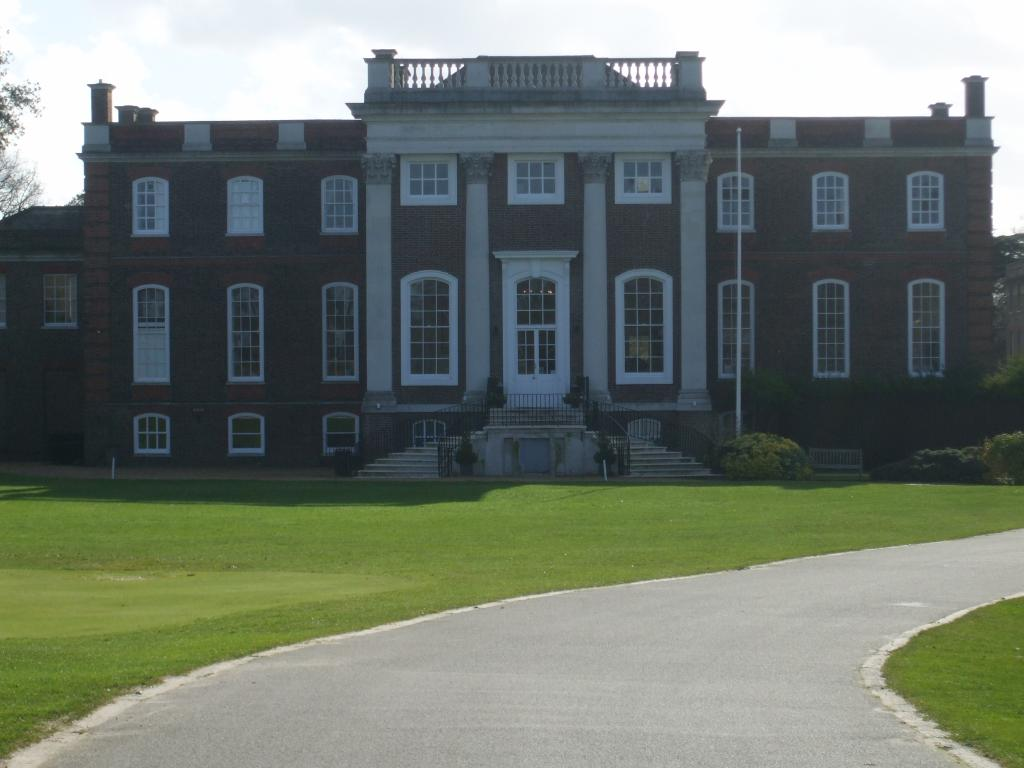
Sudbrook House, now the home of Richmond Golf Club

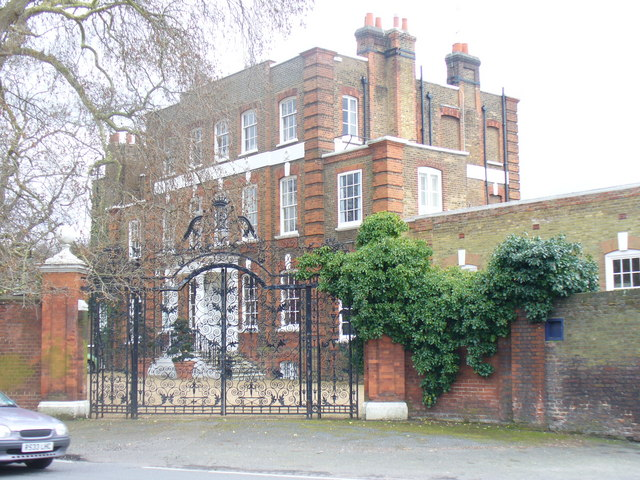
Montrose House was for many years the home of Tommy Steele.

== See also ==
- German School London

== Sources ==
- Weinreb, Ben; Hibbert, Christopher; Keay, John; Keay, Julia (2010). The London Encyclopaedia. Pan Macmillan. ISBN 9781405049252.
