= Brewer's Lane =

Street in London, England

Coordinates: 51.460786°N 0.304854°W

Brewer's Lane

Brewer's Lane is an alleyway in Richmond, London. One of three alleys on Richmond Green, it runs from the Green in the northwest, to George Street in the southeast, a similar path to nearby Golden Court.

== History and description ==
Along with the other lanes and alleys of the Green, Brewer's Lane dates from the early 17th century. Four shops stood at the end of the lane from 1617, and possibly as early as 1586. It was paved in 1651 alongside Church Court by the Vestry as the pathways connected Richmond Green to St Mary Magdalene Church.

The alley is home to a number of shops and restaurants, maintaining similarity with its historic character. The Lily Pot, a successful inn, stood at the north end from the 17th century; it was eventually replaced by the original Christ's School around 1713. Today there are still a number of historic buildings along the street with many Grade II listed, including the Britannia public house.

== See also ==
- Golden Court
- Paved Court
