= Paved Court =

Street in London, England

Coordinates: 51.460247°N 0.306705°W

Paved Court

Paved Court is an alleyway in Richmond, London. One of three alleys on Richmond Green, it runs from the Green in the north-east, to King Street in the south-west.

== History and description ==
Along with the other lanes and alleys of the Green, Paved Court dates from the early 17th century. The first houses were built in the 1690s when a row of seven shops was built alongside nearby Old Palace Terrace by Thomas Wollins, replacing a large house on the site. All the houses along the street are Grade II listed; many of them date from the 18th and 19th centuries and some are older but with 19th-century alterations.

The alley is home to a number of shops and restaurants. This is similar to its historic character as the alleys leading up to the Green had some of the first shops in Richmond. The Prince's Head public house is on the corner with Golden Court.

== See also ==
- Golden Court
- Brewer's Lane
