= Oak House, Richmond =

House in Richmond, London

Oak House
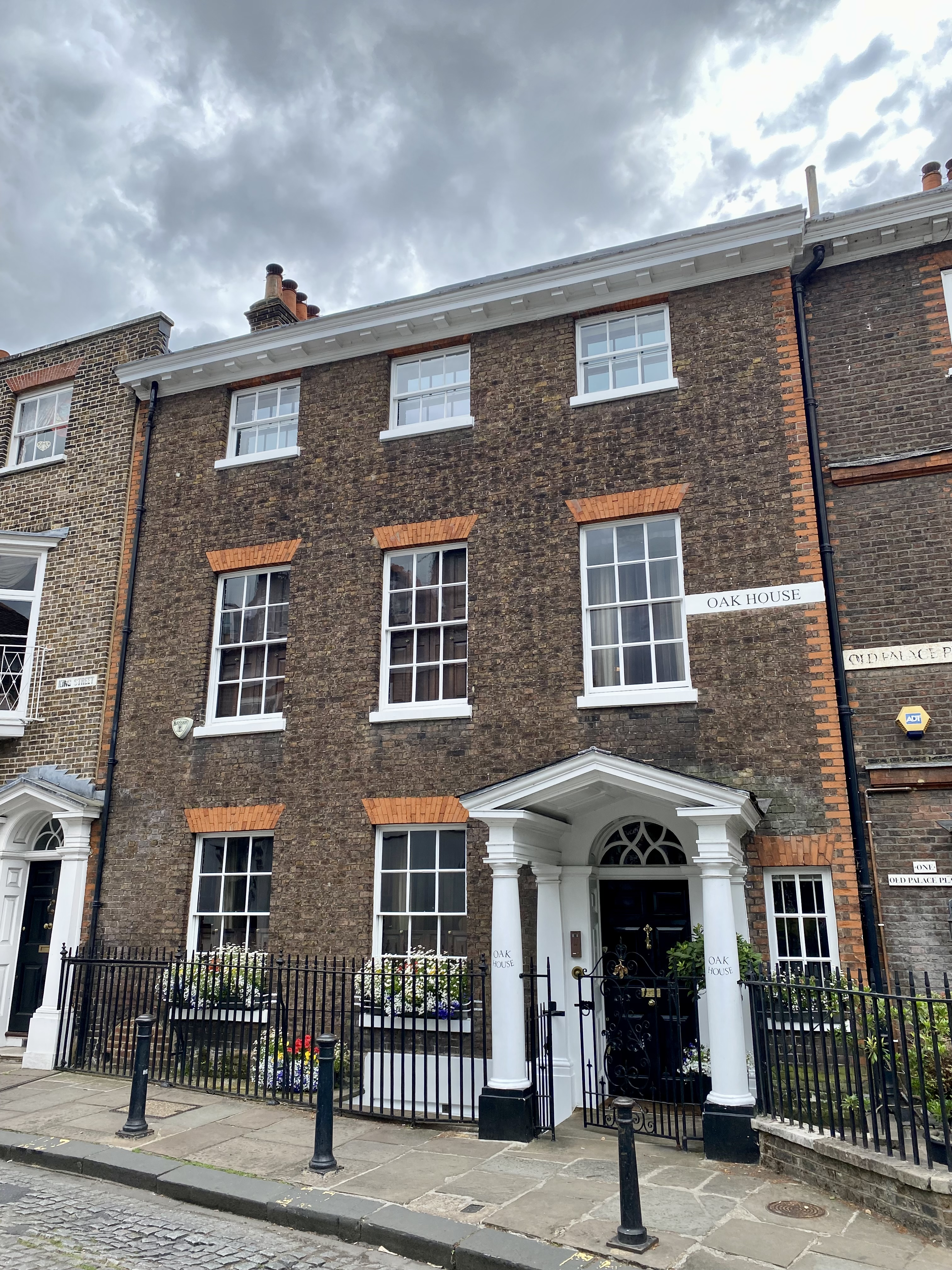

General information
- Type: Residential
- Location: London, England
- Coordinates: 51°27′37″N 0°18′27″W
- Completed: c. 1769

Design and construction
- Architect: Generally attributed to Robert Taylor

Listed Building – Grade II*
- Official name: Gates and Railings to Oak House Oak House
- Designated: 10 January 1950
- Reference no.: 1065313

Oak House is a Grade II* listed building overlooking Richmond Green in Richmond, London. The building, its gates and its railings are Grade II* listed.

== History and description ==
The house was built in around 1769. Robert Taylor, who also built nearby Asgill House, is commonly credited as its architect. Taylor also provided the decorated interior which remains intact.

The house also housed the headquarters of the Richmond branch of the YMCA from 1897 to 1915. Today, the building is Grade II* listed and part of the Richmond Green conservation area.

== See also ==
- Old Palace Terrace
- Old Palace Place
- Old Friars
