= Golden Court =

Street in London, England

Coordinates: 51.460335°N 0.306127°W

Golden Court

Golden Court is an alleyway in Richmond, London. One of three alleys on Richmond Green, it runs from the Green in the north-west, to George Street in the south-east, similarly to nearby Brewers Lane.

== History and description ==
Along with the other lanes and alleys of the Green, it dates from the early 17th century. It was known until the 20th century as Pensioners Alley, and previously had two offshoots known as Golden Square, which had been put up by 1823, and Gosling's Court. The expansion of Gosling & Sons department store to the south-west of the alley encroached onto it, leading the demolition of a number of houses.

The alley is home to a number of shops and restaurants, which is similar to its historic character with the alleys leading up to the green having some of the first shops in Richmond. The northern end of the alley previously had an arched entrance, and now has the Prince's Head public house on the corner with Paved Court.

== See also ==
- Paved Court
- Brewer's Lane
