= Jamie Crick =

British radio broadcaster (1966–2023)

- Born: James Leonard Crick; 2 August 1966; Chelsea, London, England
- Died: 29 August 2023 (aged 57)
- Education: Christ's School; University of Westminster
- Occupations: Radio broadcaster, presenter and voice artist
- Years active: 1988–2023
- Employer(s): Classic FM, BBC, Jazz FM, Gaydar Radio and Encore Radio

James Leonard Crick (2 August 1966 – 29 August 2023) was a British radio broadcaster. Once a presenter on Classic FM, Encore Radio and Jazz FM, he hosted a show on Scala Radio from March 2019 until his death in 2023.

== Early life ==
James Leonard Crick was born on 2 August 1966 in Chelsea, London, where he was also raised. He was educated at Christ's School, followed by the University of Westminster, where he gained a BA degree in Communication and Media Studies. Initially working as a presenter for County Sound Radio in Guildford for three years, he then became a presenter and producer for BBC Radio 3.

== Classic FM ==
In 1994, he joined Classic FM and during his 20 years there he presented a number of programmes, including Opera in the Park and the record attempt to create the world's largest orchestra at the Symphony Hall, Birmingham. He also presented the Classic FM Youth Orchestra concerts and was a regular contributor of reviews and articles to Classic FM Magazine. He was best known for presenting the 1–5 pm weekday afternoon slot, which included Classic FM Requests.

In September 2014, it was announced that Crick's contract had not been renewed and he departed from the station shortly after.

== Jazz FM ==
In October 2014, Crick joined Jazz FM, initially as a guest presenter of The Performance Series. He then went on to host the Afternoon Drive slot on the network, from 2 pm and from September 2015 he became the station's breakfast show presenter.

== Personal life and death ==
Crick's hobbies included music, cycling, football and current affairs. He died on 29 August 2023, having presented his last show on Jazz FM the previous day. He was 57.
