= Old Palace Place =

House in Richmond, London

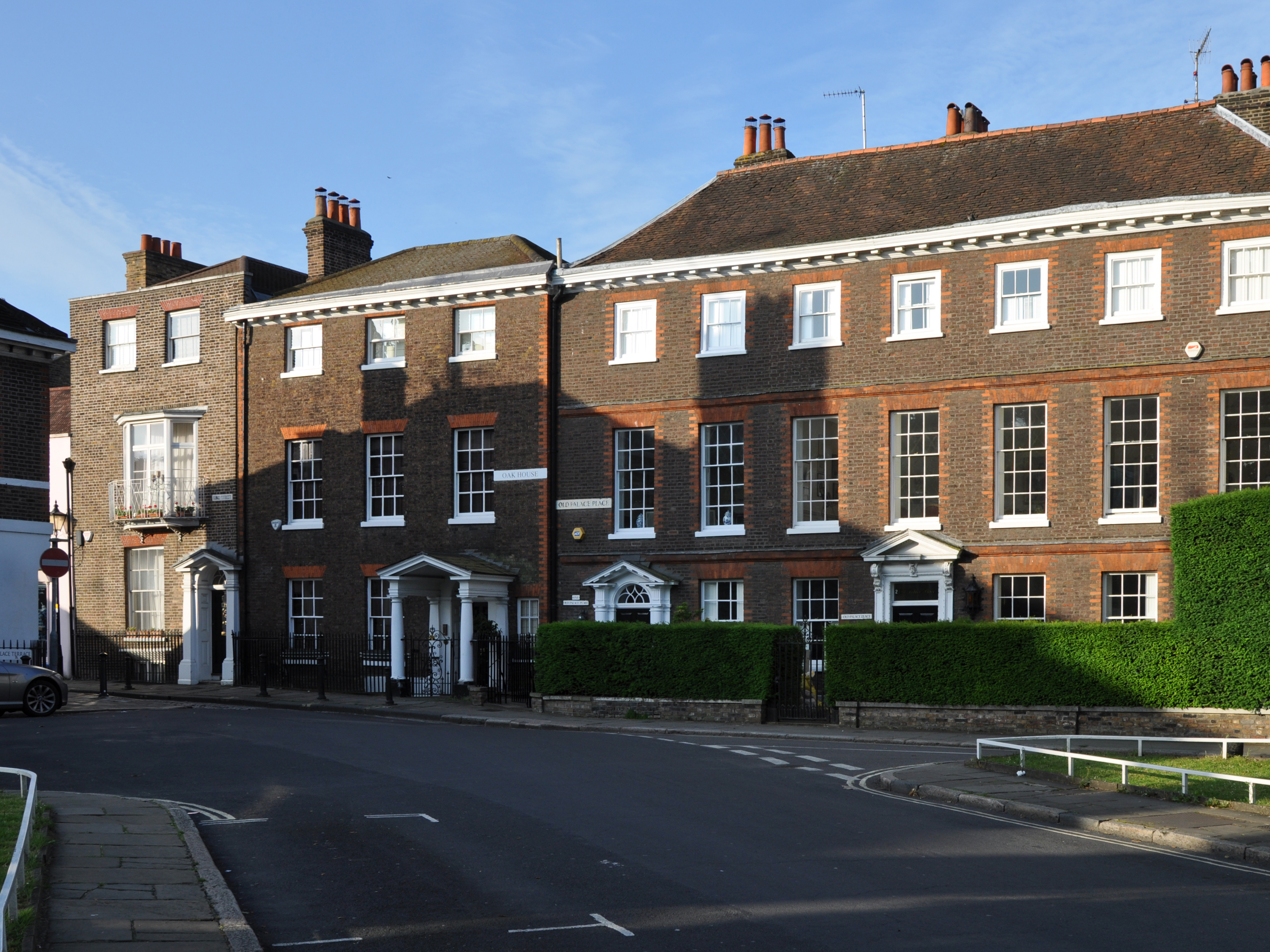
- Old Palace Place (right) next to Oak House (left)

General information
- Type: Residential
- Location: London, England
- Coordinates: 51°27′37″N 0°18′27″W
- Completed: c. 1700

Design and construction
- Architect: Generally attributed to Robert Taylor

Listed Building – Grade II*
- Official name: Old Palace Place
- Designated: 10 January 1950
- Reference no.: 1065314

Old Palace Place is a Grade II* listed building overlooking Richmond Green in Richmond, London.

== History and description ==
The house was built in around 1700. There is evidence that it incorporated a former Tudor house of the 16th century, with the discovery of Tudor furnishings and wall paintings found during the First World War. At the time the building was in use as a Red Cross hospital.

The house was occupied between in the 1920s and 30s by the art historian Kenneth Clark who had the house restored and consolidated the building into a single home after it had been subdivided into two. It was redivided again in 1983. The house was listed as Grade II* in 1950 and today is part of the Richmond Green Conservation Area.

== See also ==
- Old Palace Terrace
- Oak House
- Old Friars
