= William Christian Sellé =

Dr William Christian Sellé
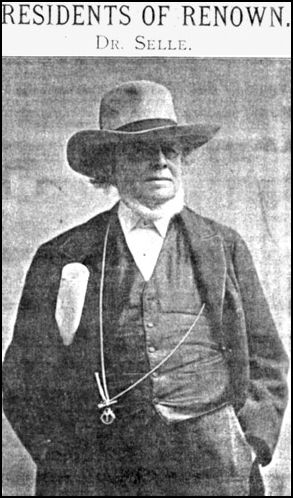
- William Christian Sellé circa 1890

Background information
- Born: 9 July 1813; Benhall, Suffolk, England
- Died: 8 November 1898 (aged 85) Richmond, Surrey, England
- Genres: Classical, Romanticism
- Occupations: Musician in Ordinary, Professor of Music
- Instruments: Organ, Piano, Violin
- Years active: c. 1828 – 1886

William Christian Sellé (1813–1898) was a Victorian doctor of music, composer and for forty years Musician in Ordinary to Queen Victoria.

== Biography ==
=== Early life ===
William Christian Sellé was born in Benhall, Suffolk in 1813. His parents were Elizabeth Underwood, from a farming family in Suffolk, and Christian Sellé (1781–1867), a musician who had left Hanover with Viotti, a celebrated violinist, to join the private band of the 15th Light Dragoons of Ernest Augustus Duke of Cumberland (1771 – 1851) who was then living at the royal residence in Kew and was forming a band of mainly German musicians. Sellé was bilingual from an early age.

Sellé began his musical education at a young age. He was placed under the tutelage of another of the Duke of Cumberland's musicians, a Mr Platt. At fifteen he became a pupil of Cipriani Potter, at that time the principal of the Royal Academy of Music where he specialised in pianoforte. Early on, while he was under tutelage, Sellé demonstrated the ability to teach music and Potter trusted him enough to allow him to teach the other pupils. He was at the academy for about two years and then started a 70-year career as a teacher. He was primarily a teacher of the piano and organ but was also a skilled violinist and owned a Stradivarius.

=== Career ===
Sellé recalled in 1878 in a letter to The Times that he had befriended the young son of the Duke, Prince George of Cumberland (later George V of Hanover) (1819 – 1878) following a serious accident in 1828 that caused a temporary loss of sight. He related that he was in constant attendance, providing support throughout the illness to Prince George who was his first royal pupil. Sellé composed a piece of music for the young prince. This was probably his first published piece. The Favorite Gallopade, with variations for the Piano Forte, a copy of which is held at The British Library. In 1830 he wrote 'Les Festins de Kew' dedicated to Lady Quentin (probably Georgina Quentin, a mistress of George IV).

Sellé married Selina Daniel in 1835. He spent the next years raising a family and developing his teaching career that included several members of the royal household. In 1845 he was appointed Organist of the Chapel Royal at Hampton Court Palace, a prestigious role that he held for some 40 years. There is a record of him requesting the formation of a permanent choir at Hampton Court in 1853, the same year that he helped organise a concert at Hampton Court in aid of the Crimean War Relief Fund. This took place in the Great Hall which was opened to the public for the first time.

Sellé was awarded a Lambeth Music Doctorate by Archbishop Sumner in 1857. The 1850s to the 1860s were his most prolific as a composer. The British Library archive has around forty published pieces by Sellé and Cambridge University Library has eleven. The majority are from the middle decades of the century. They are relatively short pieces for the piano and organ. The piano compositions are light and easily accessible in style, essentially salon pieces. His work illustrates his love of the composers of the First Viennese School and places Sellé within the romantic tradition of English music. The Era reviewing his Mazurka in 1850 described it as "an elgant piece of music, replete with taste and refinement." In 1863 during a lecture he spoke in no uncertain terms about ‘the modern rubbish, which passes current for music.' In 1874 he set the poem 'The Happiest Land' by Longfellow as a song which the Morning Post reviewed as "one of those effusions which excite wonder that it should have been written, and being written that it should have been printed, and being printed that it should ever be sung." In 1886, he was commissioned by the Shelley Society to provide music for Hellas, a lyrical drama by Percy Bysshe Shelley. This was performed in October 1894 with the actress Alma Murray in the lead role. The musical score came in for much artistic criticism but remains Sellé's best known score and is still available and in print.

Sellé's obituary mentions a love of Beethoven whom he refers to as ’his dear master’. Sellé's inclination was to favour an establishment view of classical music reinforced by his known dislike of ‘modern music’. Throughout his career as a teacher Sellé maintained a close musical relationship with many of his pupils. He played the organ at the marriage of his former pupil Princess Mary of Cambridge and was by the accounts that still exist a convivial, loquacious man with a string of anecdotes that made him exceptional company. In later life he was to become a familiar character in his community with an affectation of wearing what was described as a 'sombrero'. Sellé retired as organist at the Chapel Royal in 1886 at the age of seventy three.

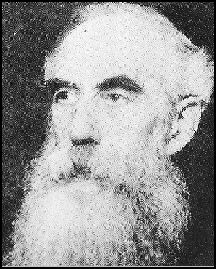
Harry Buxton Forman

A Liberal and supporter of Gladstone, Sellé was an active member of his community taking part in the issues of the day. He was a member of the Richmond Select Vestry (Parish Council) from 1853 until his death. He also stood unsuccessfully as a Liberal candidate when Richmond received its Charter of Incorporation. He made an unsuccessful attempt to bring about the opening of the Richmond Public Library for which he was a serving committee member.

=== Personal life ===
Sellé married Selina Daniel (1816–1902) at Christ Church, Southwark, on 20 July 1835, setting up home in Kew; in 1841 they were living on Kew Green as part of the King of Hanover's entourage. His wife was appointed the first wet nurse for Queen Victoria's first child. By 1851 the family had moved to Richmond on Thames where he was to live for the remainder of his life. Their children were William Christian (1836–1840), Selina Elizabeth (1838–1840), Laura (1841–1932), Allegra (1842–1909), Emily Blanche (1844–1895), Julia (1847–1892), and Guarnerius (1849–1889).

He lived at Old Palace Terrace, Richmond Green, from about 1851-1892, and then 3 Hermitage Road, Richmond. He died of a heart attack whilst drinking at The Greyhound Hotel in Richmond on 8 November 1898. He was buried in Richmond Old Burial Ground along with his daughter Emily Blanche and his wife Selina.

At the time of his death he left a widow and two adult daughters. Laura married Harry Buxton Forman, a leading bibliographer, rare manuscripts editor and scholar of all things Shelley, in 1869 at St Matthias Church, Richmond. His son Guarnerius (so-named after the Italian violin makers Guarneri) married Jessie Button at St Mary's, Staines, in 1873; they lived in Twickenham and he worked at the Stock Exchange. Allegra married Benjamin Bull at Holy Trinity Twickenham, in 1865. Julia married Thomas Bull at St John the Evangelist, Penge, in 1865.

== Bibliography ==
- Hellas, A Lyrical Drama by Percy Bysshe Shelley, edited by H Buxton Forman, choruses by W C Sellé, Nabu Press (2010) ISBN 978-1-141-31797-4
