= Old Friars =

House in Richmond, London

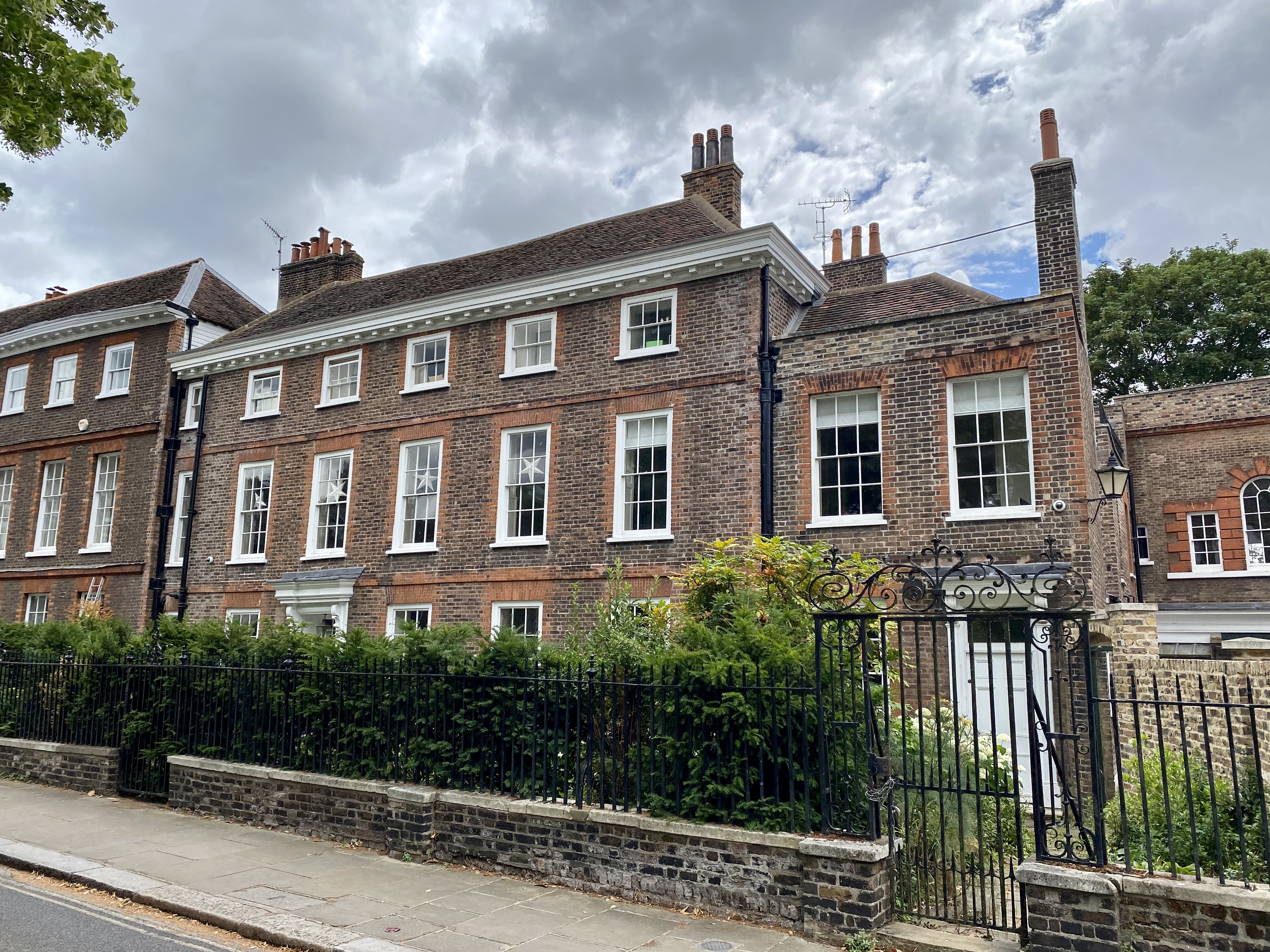

General information
- Type: Residential
- Location: London, England
- Coordinates: 51°27′37″N 0°18′28″W
- Completed: 1687

Listed Building – Grade II*
- Official name: Gate and Railings to Old Friars Old Friars
- Designated: 10 January 1950
- Reference no.: 1065315

Old Friars is a building overlooking Richmond Green in Richmond, London. The building, its gates and its railings are Grade II* listed.

== History and description ==
The house was built in 1687 with surviving cellars from around 1500. In the 1730s an extension was added on the right side, now known as Beaver Lodge, which was used for assemblies and concerts. Before this however, the house was already used for entertainment with an 1722 advertisement in The Daily Courant describing the events held there.

In the late 19th century, the house was used by the Richmond Liberal and Radical Club. The house has been Grade II* listed along with its gates and railings since 1950 and is part of the Richmond Green Conservation Area. Richard Attenborough is among the former residents of the house who lived there from 1949 until moving to Denville Hall in 2012 after which the house was sold.

== See also ==
- Old Palace Terrace
- Old Palace Place
- Oak House
