= Old Palace Terrace =

Terrace in Richmond, London

Coordinates: 51.46041°N 0.30701°W

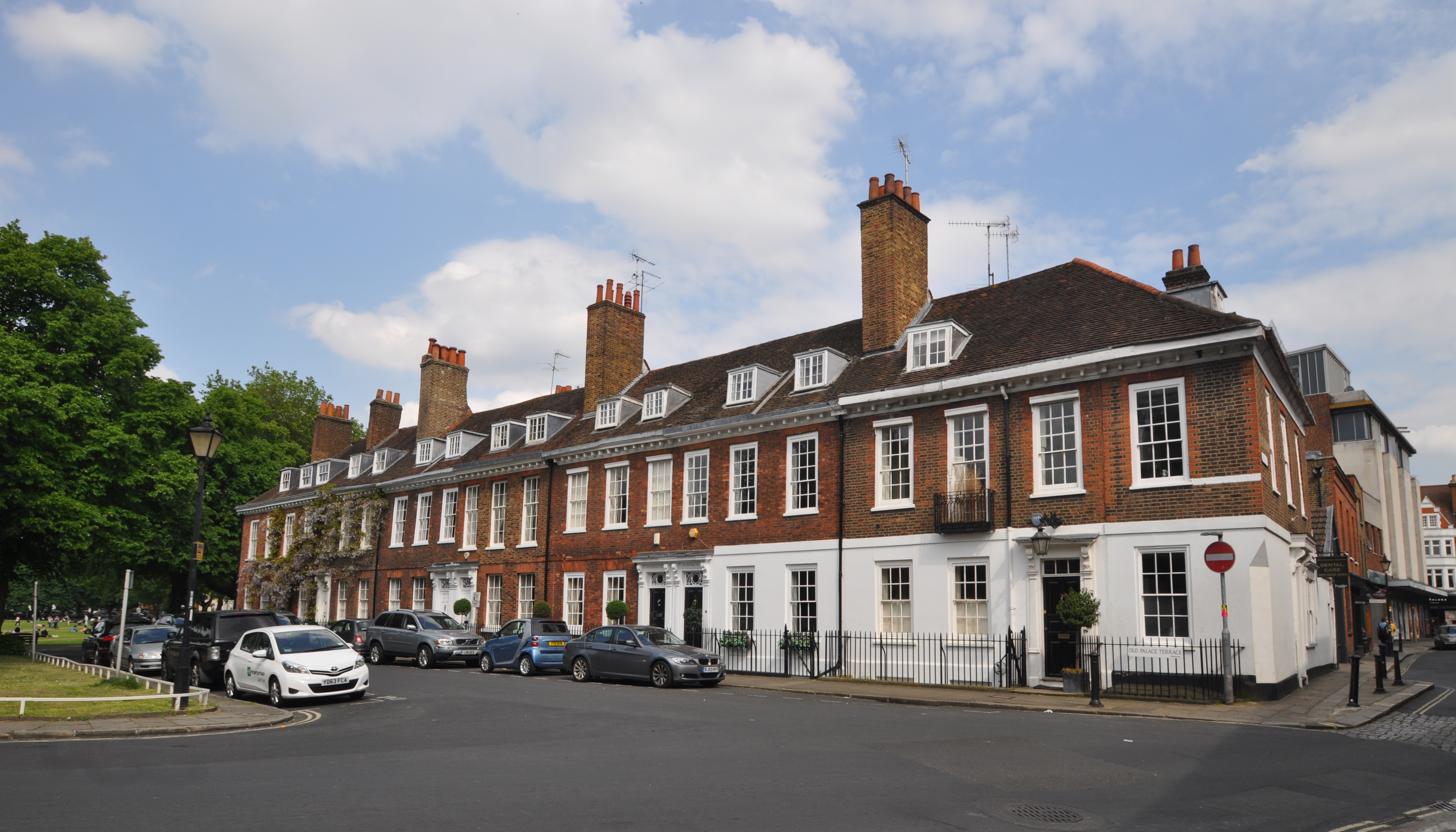
Old Palace Terrace

Old Palace Terrace is a terrace of houses in Richmond, London, fronting onto the southern corner of Richmond Green. Built in 1692, when Richmond was in Surrey, they are a very early example of a brick terrace in England outside London.

== History and description ==
The site of the houses was land owned by the Charterhouse of Shene until the dissolution of the monasteries; by 1635 it had become a large house owned by a Mr Kirkham.

The houses were built in 1692 by local carpenter William Wollings for landowner Vertue Radford who had them put up as a speculative venture. Their construction was a particularly early example of the brick terrace to be built outside London as Richmond was then in Surrey. In 1732 they were named Powell's Row; their name was changed in 1851 by Richmond Vestry to that they hold today. The houses are Grade II* listed and part of the Richmond Green Conservation Area.

Notable residents of the houses include John James Heidegger who also lived for a time at nearby Maids of Honour Row, James Stephen Rigaud and his son Stephen Peter Rigaud who grew up there and later lived in 21 Richmond Green, and William Christian Sellé.

== See also ==
- Old Palace Place
- Old Friars
- Oak House
