= The Prince's Head =

Public house in Richmond, London

Coordinates: 51.4604°N 0.3063°W

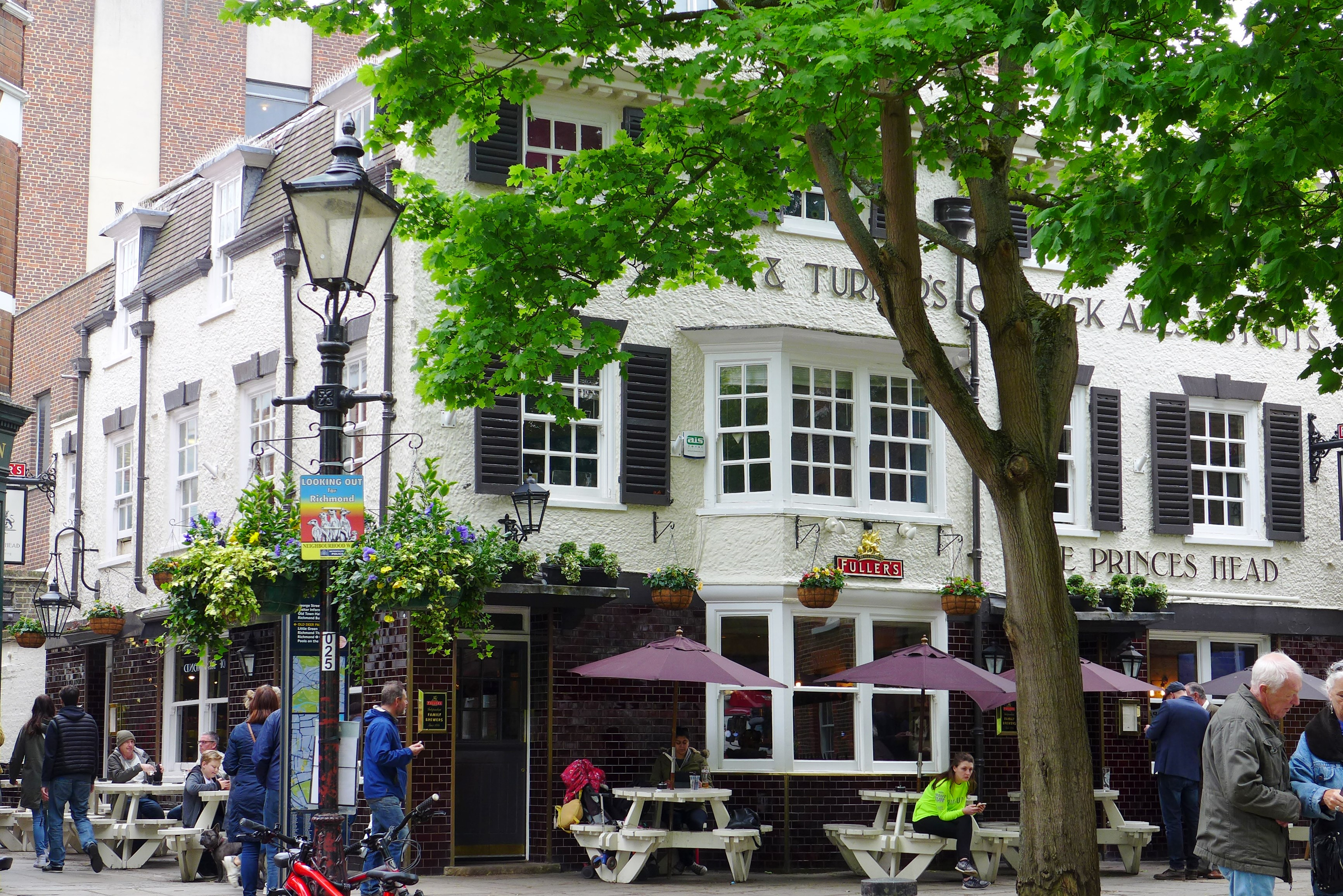
The Prince's Head as seen from Richmond Green

The Prince's Head is a public house on Richmond Green in Richmond, London on the corner of Paved Court and Golden Court. It is one of two pubs on the green alongside The Cricketers.

== History ==
The pub has a sign advertising "Fuller Smith and Turner's Chiswick Ales and Stouts" from the Fuller's Brewery which runs it. It was originally named "The Duke's Head" after the Duke of Ormonde and renamed in 1778. The licence was at one point held by the cricketer Tom Richardson. The current pub may have been built in 1740, although its history is said to date back to as early as 1705.

== The Crown and Anchor ==
The pub features prominently in the AppleTV show Ted Lasso as "The Crown and Anchor" with the eponymous Ted Lasso frequenting the pub. Brendan Hunt, co-creator of the show, said he found the Prince's Head upon first visiting to be a "perfect English bar". On the show it serves as the supporters' pub of the fictional London football club A.F.C. Richmond and saw an influx of visitors after its appearance, with the landlord quoting the figure at hundreds of visitors a day. Scenes in the interior of the Crown and Anchor however are filmed on a set. The real pub does include references to the show, with a booth including framed A.F.C. Richmond kits and photos autographed by the cast hanging inside. In October 2023 it was opened as a novelty Airbnb for four nights, following the announcement of season three of the show.
