= Ham bank murder =

1976 murder in London during a bank robbery

- Metropolitan Police circular distributed in the manhunt to locate Woolliscroft's murderer
- Location: 51.4313°N 0.3073°W; Barclays Bank, Upper Ham Road, Ham, south-west London
- Date: 10 November 1976 c. 2:31 p.m.
- Weapon: Sawn-off 12-gauge Reilly shotgun
- Victim: Angela Mary Woolliscroft (20)
- Perpetrator: Michael George Hart (38)
- Motive: Robbery; Eyewitness elimination
- Charges: Murder (1 count); Deception (6 counts)
- Verdict: Guilty

The Ham bank murder was a fatal shooting at a suburban branch of Barclays Bank in the Ham district of London on 10 November 1976. The victim, bank clerk Angela Mary Woolliscroft, was fatally shot by a career criminal named Michael George Hart during an armed robbery in which approximately £2,500 was stolen.

Hart was arrested for the crime two months later; he was convicted of Woolliscroft's murder at the Old Bailey in November 1977 and sentenced to life imprisonment with a recommendation he serve a minimum of twenty-five years. He was released from prison in November 2002.

== Background ==
=== Woolliscroft ===
Angela Mary Woolliscroft was born in Surrey on 21 August 1956, the first child born to William Walter and Juliana (née Roberts) Woolliscroft, who had married in Wallasey in 1953 and relocated to South East England prior to her birth. She lived with her family in Hook, Chessington. She had two younger sisters: Jackie (b. 1958) and Sally (b. 1960).

Woolliscroft completed her schooling in 1972 at age sixteen. The same year, she obtained employment with Barclays Bank as a trainee clerk. By the autumn of 1976, Woolliscroft had been employed by Barclays for four years and worked as a cashier at a suburban branch on Ham Parade, Upper Ham Road, Richmond. In addition to having recently become engaged, she had also recently passed her driving test and purchased her first car. Her mother would later recollect that by the mid-1970s, her oldest daughter "had reached the age where she was a friend. We were not just a mother and daughter, but really great friends ... she was a very loving and affectionate girl. She used to take the mickey out of me. The last film I saw with her was Jaws ... she wanted to see if she could scare her mother."

An athletic young woman with a passion for hockey, Woolliscroft often represented Barclays Bank at sporting tournaments and trained on a weekly basis at the bank's sports ground in Ealing, London, with over twenty other young women who worked for other London branches of Barclays Bank. These hockey tournaments were hosted around the United Kingdom and frequently required Woolliscroft to travel considerable distances. Hours after close of business on 10 November 1976, she and her teammates were due to fly to Guernsey to participate in a further hockey tournament.

=== Hart ===
Michael George Hart was born in 1938. He was a painter and decorator by trade, but a violent career criminal who had amassed an extensive criminal record dating back to the 1960s with numerous convictions for offences including car theft, robbery, assault, and fraud. Beginning in 1966, several of Hart's convictions had resulted in his incarceration, although he had invariably reverted to criminal activities shortly after his release from prison. By 1976, Hart had been at liberty for three years, having served three years' imprisonment for attempted burglary and attacking a police officer with an iron bar. He lived with his wife, Maureen, and three children in Basingstoke, Hampshire, approximately thirty-five miles (56 km) from Ham.

By 1976, Hart was wanted by police in Paris for the attempted murder of a policeman, whom he had attempted to shoot near Charles de Gaulle Airport in August that year after stabbing and seriously wounding a taxi driver. This incident had occurred in August, and French police—having gradually become aware of Hart's identity—had contacted Interpol that autumn in efforts to trace his whereabouts and extradite him to France. Furthermore, on four occasions in the months prior to November 1976, Hart had been arrested and charged with various offences including burglary, robbery, and car theft. On each occasion, he had appeared before magistrates in Basingstoke and although investigators had requested he be remanded in custody until trial on each of these four occasions, in each instance, he had been granted bail.

One of the conditions of Hart's bail was that he report to the Hampshire and Isle of Wight Constabulary on a twice daily basis. The last occasion Hart would do so before going on the run was the afternoon of 21 November 1976.

== 10 November 1976 ==
On the morning of 10 November 1976, Woolliscroft drove from her parents' home to work in her Ford Cortina, arriving shortly before 9 a.m. By 9:30 a.m., the bank opened for business as normal. Eleven staff were present within the premises.

The precise sequence of Hart's movements on the morning of 10 November are unknown, although he is known to have reported to a police station close to his Basingstoke home early in the morning, as stipulated by his pretrial bail conditions. Shortly afterwards, he drove to a multi-storey car park in Kingston upon Thames, where he selected a maroon Austin A40 to use as a getaway vehicle; he parked his own car at this location, then broke into the Austin A40 and drove to the Barclays branch on Upper Ham Road. Before exiting the vehicle, he applied brown make-up to his face and neck in the hope of being mistaken for a Pakistani, then donned a dark wig, framed sunglasses and gloves and entered the premises with a stolen sawn-off shotgun concealed beneath a woman's yellow raincoat he had found on the passenger seat of the stolen Austin. Hart loaded both barrels of the firearm prior to entering the bank.

The cartridge damage to the glass protective partition screen following Woolliscroft's murder

=== Robbery ===
By 12:30 p.m. Woolliscroft had been performing her usual duties as a cashier for three hours. Hart is believed to have entered the premises at approximately 12:29 p.m. A total of eleven staff were present in the bank at the time. He would later inform investigators he immediately chose to approach Woolliscroft's desk as, unlike her fellow cashier, she was not preoccupied with a customer request. Hart approached the till behind which Woolliscroft was working, took out the shotgun from beneath the raincoat and placed the barrels against the triple glass protective partition screen, demanding cash and threatening to shoot her unless she complied. (Note: The glass protective partition screens within Barclays Bank measured five-sixths of an inch in thickness.)

=== Murder ===
Woolliscroft is not believed to have immediately attempted to alert her colleagues to the unfolding armed robbery; she is known to have wordlessly gathered several wads of money, which she placed into the tray beneath the protective screen as Hart maintained his aim with the shotgun. (Note: Woolliscroft had been seated close to a concealed alarm button at the time Hart had placed his shotgun against the glass partition and directly at her face; however, she was not close enough to reach the button without conspicuously moving her body and alerting his attention to her gesture.) As Hart finished gathering the money from the tray into a bag, he fired the shotgun once, destroying the safety glass screen, hitting Woolliscroft in the hand, face, neck, and chest, severing her left carotid artery and blowing her seat backwards. Woolliscroft then slumped to the ground face-down beside her counter seat as several of her colleagues threw themselves to the ground or sought cover. Hart immediately ran from the bank with his takings, and a cashier named Sheila Reid—who had been standing to Woolliscroft's right placing chequebook covers into a cupboard at the time of the robbery—pressed an alarm button. Despite efforts from her colleagues and paramedics, Woolliscroft died on the way to hospital. A post mortem would reveal she had bled to death from a neck wound measuring one inch in diameter.

Although several individuals attempted to follow Hart after he exited the bank, he soon became lost among a crowd of workers leaving a factory entrance for their lunch break. Hart then entered his getaway vehicle and immediately drove to the multi-storey car park where he had earlier parked his own vehicle; he switched vehicles, then drove to Hampton Court Palace, where he threw the shotgun stock into the River Thames before driving home. He later buried the barrels of the shotgun in a garden close to his home.

The robbery and murder had netted Hart approximately £2,500 (the equivalent of approximately £17,150 as of 2026). (Note: Some sources state the sum of money stolen by Hart was £2,000.)

== Manhunt ==
The murder of Angela Woolliscroft caused intense public outrage, and Scotland Yard launched an exhaustive manhunt to identify and arrest the perpetrator. The individual in charge of the manhunt was Detective Chief Superintendent (DCI) James Sewell, who was assisted by Alan Wadsworth and Robert Hancock.

Extensive police and media appeals for information generated numerous leads of inquiry, and Barclays Bank offered a reward of £50,000 for information leading to the arrest and conviction of the gunman, whom eyewitnesses described as being aged approximately twenty-five, 5 ft 8 in (170 cm) tall, of slim build, with a tanned or dark complexion and hollow cheeks. (Note: A facial composite of this individual was released to the media shortly after Woolliscroft's murder.) Investigators conducted extensive door-to-door inquiries at over 15,000 addresses across South East England and over 5,000 persons of interest were interrogated.

This bank raid was planned by a person who quite clearly thought [shooting Woolliscroft] was a clever thing to do ... but he made just one mistake: Whoever it was, could not have appreciated the utter revulsion people in this country feel at what he did.

— Coroner John Burton, speaking at the inquest into Woolliscroft's death (17 November 1976).

Investigators strongly believed the armed robbery had been committed by a seasoned criminal as opposed to an amateur. As such, all known armed robbers within London and the home counties were questioned, their whereabouts on the date of the murder verified and, when applicable, eliminated from the inquiry. Several of these individuals were questioned and eliminated from police inquiries following dawn raids in relation to other criminal offences, although sixty-five individuals were prosecuted for unrelated crimes. Hart was himself interviewed by detectives shortly after the murder; however, as he had presented himself at a police station in Basingstoke on both the morning and afternoon of the murder and his physical description did not closely match that of the perpetrator, he was not initially considered a strong suspect.

=== Forensic developments ===
Two pieces of physical evidence left by the perpetrator at the crime scene were the distinctive yellow, size 16 Marks & Spencer ladies' raincoat he had initially used to hide the shotgun and which had been discarded as the perpetrator fled from the bank to his getaway vehicle and a large, empty, pale orange plastic bag that had contained New Grain fertiliser—apparently also used by the perpetrator to conceal the shotgun. The fertiliser bag was soon traced to a retired gardener who stated he had used the bag to clear fallen leaves from a location close to the bank on the morning of the murder; this development yielded no tangible leads beyond the perpetrator's likely movements shortly before entering the bank.

A scrap of paper retrieved from a pocket of the raincoat had initially been an entry form for a college wine-making competition. The form had been signed with the name 'Grahame'; the reverse had been used as a shopping list. Police inquiries soon revealed that the entry form had been issued to a Grahame James Marshall, and that the raincoat belonged to his sister, who had used the entry form to write a shopping list. Miss Marshall informed investigators that at 10:30 on the morning of the robbery, she had parked her car in the Kingston upon Thames multi-storey car park, only to return to the vehicle at approximately 2 p.m. to notice the car—which she had left unlocked—had been moved, and that her raincoat was missing. She had assumed a parking attendant had moved her vehicle, and had not bothered to report the raincoat as stolen. A forensic examination of the seats within the vehicle revealed scores of glass shards of precisely the type used within the glass screen through which Woolliscroft had been fatally shot.

By 15 November, forensic ballistic analysis had determined the firearm used to murder Woolliscroft was a 12-gauge shotgun, and that the pellets within the discharged cartridge were typically used by individuals hunting wild game. As such, investigators appealed for any individual who had either lost such a firearm or had one stolen to come forward and assist with their inquiries. This development led to sections of the River Thames being searched by underwater units—to no avail.

==== Identification of perpetrator ====
In the early hours of 22 November, two police officers responded to reports of a robbery at a Basingstoke garage. As they approached the scene, they observed a blue Ford Consul speed away from the forecourt in the opposite direction to their travel. The officers gave chase, although the suspect soon crashed the vehicle and fled across nearby fields. Although the suspect escaped, both officers recognized him as Michael George Hart.

A search of the Ford Consul revealed a Hendaye .22 automatic pistol and seventy-two rounds of live ammunition, some jewellery recently reported as stolen, several driving licenses, and articles of clothing which could be used to conceal an individual's identity. Inquiries revealed the firearm had been stolen from a gun dealer in Reading on 4 November, and that an antique 12-gauge Reilly shotgun, several boxes of Eley No. 7 trap shooting cartridges, and a Webley revolver had also been stolen. These discoveries were sufficient to obtain a search warrant of Hart's home in St Peters Road, Basingstoke.

The police search of Hart's house on the afternoon of 22 November revealed a hoard of stolen items hidden beneath the stairs in addition to a box containing nineteen shotgun cartridges of precisely the brand stolen in Reading on 4 November. An initial examination of these cartridges revealed the shells to be labelled as a type of hardened trap shot typically used in clay pigeon shooting as opposed to wild game shot; however, a forensic examination of the contents of the cartridges revealed they had been filled with the type of pellets used in hunting wild game—the type which had been used to murder Woolliscroft. These developments resulted in Hart's home being placed under 24-hour surveillance and a warrant issued for his arrest.

A subsequent check of records at the manufacturing plant which had produced the cartridges revealed a computing error had mislabelled a batch of wild game cartridges as trap shells, and that the Reading gun dealer had been supplied with several boxes of these mislabelled cartridges.

== Arrest ==
Hart, pictured following his arrest for Wooliscroft's murder

In the weeks following the attempted robbery of the Basingstoke garage, Hart—fully aware of his status as a wanted fugitive—had failed to return to his home or initiate contact with criminal acquaintances. He had been living in a caravan with a young secretary named Sharon Stacey, occasionally earning money by performing decorating work for cash using an alias but primarily surviving on the money stolen during the robbery. He was arrested in Hounslow, West London, on 20 January 1977 shortly after entering the offices of a London garage firm for whom he had performed painting and decorating work prior to Woolliscroft's murder and attempting to collect an outstanding sum of money owed to him. He surrendered to police without a struggle and was driven to Richmond police station to face formal questioning. The following evening, Hart attempted suicide by hanging himself with his belt in a police cell; he was resuscitated by officers and spent one evening in hospital under armed guard before being returned to Richmond police station.

=== Confession ===
Despite initially vehemently protesting his innocence, Hart was unable to explain the physical and circumstantial evidence linking him to Woolliscroft's murder. He remained consistent in his denials for several days. However, on the evening of 26 January, Hart asked for police to bring his wife and brother-in-law to the police station, stating he had important information to divulge in their presence. Upon their arrival, Hart grabbed his wife's hand and informed DCI Sewell: "It was me. I shot the bank girl. I am sorry about all the publicity." He then turned to his wife, and said, "I done it, love."

Hart then outlined the circumstances surrounding Woolliscroft's death, which he claimed to have been accidental, stating: "There were people queueing at the first till, so I went to the far one. I asked the girl for money and banged the gun against the glass to make the girl hurry up. She seemed to be ages. She was looking to the right and the gun went off as she came up. I hoped to break the glass ... the gun went off as the girl raised her head. She screamed. I had no intention of shooting anyone."

Despite claiming to have been "flabbergasted" at his shotgun discharging, Hart then claimed to have realized Woolliscroft had placed "money in the tray" before she was shot. He had then gathered this money before "walking out of the bank and back to [his getaway] car", which he then drove back to the multi-storey car park in Kingston upon Thames. He parked the vehicle in the same spot he had earlier driven it from before transferring into his own car and driving home to Basingstoke. En route, his car had broken down on the A3, causing him to call the RAC to repair his vehicle at the roadside.

=== Further developments ===
On 27 January, Hart revealed the location where he had buried the sawn-off shotgun barrels shortly after the robbery. An examination of the barrels revealed an expended cartridge in the right barrel and a live cartridge in the left—both cartridges were later determined to belong to the mislabelled batch stolen from the Reading gun dealer on 4 November. Furthermore, the unfired gun barrel yielded more than 1,000 microscopic glass fragments forensically proven to have sourced from the safety glass screen through which Hart had discharged the firearm. Later the same day, he also led detectives to where he had thrown the rest of the gun into the River Thames.

Initial criminal charges were filed against Hart pertaining to Woolliscroft's murder on 28 January; he was remanded in custody on this date, pending further inquiries. Nine weeks later, on 4 April, Hart again appeared before a Richmond magistrates' court; on this occasion, he was formally charged with Woolliscroft's murder and remanded in custody, to await trial. On the same date, Sharon Stacey was charged with obtaining property by deception; she was granted bail pending trial.

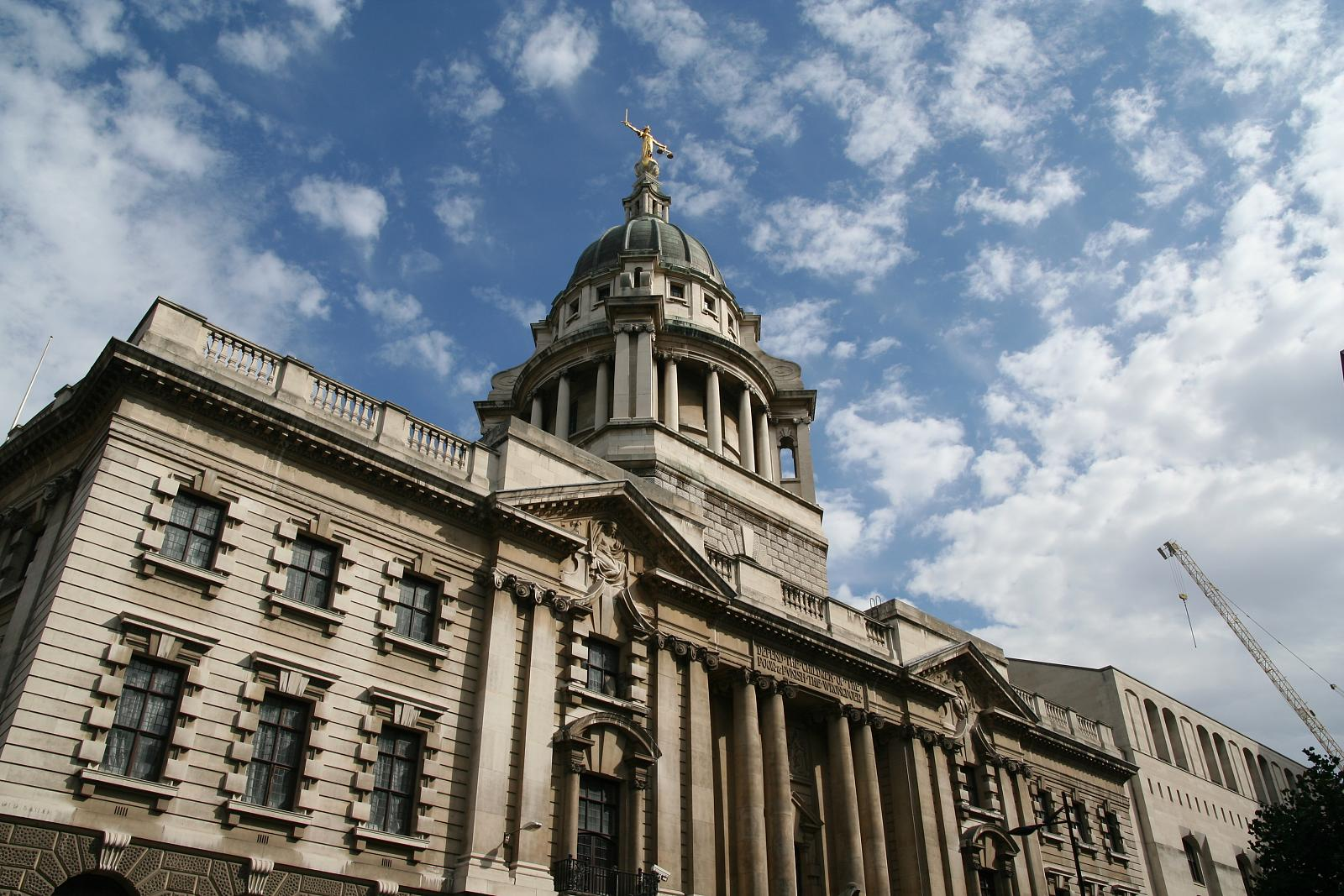
The Old Bailey, London. Hart was brought to trial at this location on 31 October 1977.

== Trial ==
Hart was brought to trial at the Old Bailey on 31 October 1977. He was tried before Mr Justice Melford Stevenson. The chief prosecutor was Michael Corkery Q.C.; Hart was defended by Mr Kennedy Q.C. He pleaded not guilty to murder but guilty to manslaughter and six counts of deception. His co-defendant, Sharon Stacey (20), was charged with and pleaded guilty to six counts of obtaining goods via deception after admitting purchasing several items with stolen cheques with Hart in the weeks following Woolliscroft's murder.

In his opening statement on behalf of the Crown, Michael Corkery outlined the circumstances surrounding Woolliscroft's murder and the prosecution's intention to prove her shooting with a loaded and cocked firearm had been deliberate and premeditated as opposed to accidental. He further outlined his intention to introduce experts who would testify as such. Hart remained silent throughout Corkery's opening statement, although he did shout "That's not true, my lord!" when Corkery claimed he had fired at Woolliscroft "through the glass" at point-blank range. His outburst was ignored.

On the second day of the trial, Hart testified in his own defense; he freely admitted to having forced Woolliscroft to hand over cash at gunpoint and that he had cocked his firearm prior to entering the bank, but remained adamant the gun had discharged by accident when he had tapped the glass screen to encourage her to hurry with his demands. In response to questioning from his defence counsel, Hart testified that he—in a nervous state and holding his left hand upon the shotgun's muzzle as his right index finger remained upon the trigger—had "become impatient" in the moments before his firearm had discharged and that he had "thrust [the shotgun] forward at the glass partition quite hard ... I intended to say 'Hurry up!' to draw [Woolliscroft's] attention to the fact I was in a hurry. I didn't get the words out [as] after the first syllable, the gun went off ... I thought I might have hit her, because I heard a muffled scream." Hart then reiterated his claims in his initial confession to have momentarily entered a state of shock before stating he had regained his composure, gathered the wads of money from the tray trough and hurriedly fled from the scene.

Hart's claims were disputed by a firearms specialist named Brian Arnold, who testified to having conducted pressure tests on the triggers of the shotgun and that six-and-a-half pounds of exerted pressure applied to the trigger were required to discharge the barrel which Hart had fired in the robbery. Arnold further testified that he had conducted various experiments in attempts to accidentally discharge the loaded shotgun and that the only way he had been able to do so was to strike the stock of the gun against a solid surface with such force the experiment had chipped the stock.

=== Conviction ===
On 2 November, the jury retired to begin deliberations. They debated for less than three hours before announcing they had reached their verdict: Hart was found guilty of murder by a majority verdict of eleven to one. The following day, he was sentenced to life imprisonment, with a recommendation that he should serve at least twenty-five years. Hart was also convicted of twenty-one other outstanding offences including criminal damage, car theft, and dishonesty, with their combined total of ninety-two years' imprisonment to run concurrently to his murder conviction. His co-defendant, Sharon Stacey, was sentenced to three years' imprisonment on the same day. (Note: Stacey had known Hart prior to Wooliscroft's murder, but had no prior knowledge of or involvement in her death. Each of the charges of obtaining property by deception for which she was convicted related to offences committed in the weeks after the murder.)

Upon imposing sentence, Mr Justice Stevenson remarked: "Your diligently pursued course of wickedness demonstrates beyond any doubt that you are a very dangerous criminal. The public should be protected from you for a very long time." Hart remained impassive upon hearing the judge pass sentence, with his eyes closed and head bowed.

Hart did appeal his conviction, although his appeal was dismissed on 20 October 1978. He was released on licence in November 2002 at the age of 64.

== Aftermath ==
Angela Woolliscroft was buried at Surbiton cemetery on 29 March 1977 following a service held at St Catherine of Siena Roman Catholic Church, Chessington, in accordance with her Roman Catholic faith. Her funeral was attended by approximately 500 mourners including members of the Metropolitan Police, the local MP Nigel Fisher, the deputy mayor of Kingston, several work colleagues, and twenty-six members of her hockey team. (Note: The hockey match Woolliscroft and her Barclays colleagues had been due to play in Guernsey shortly after her murder was cancelled two days after her death as a mark of respect.)

Shortly after Hart's conviction, Barclays Bank donated a cheque for £25,000 to charities actively supported by the Metropolitan Police. A spokesperson for Barclays stated the cheque was "in appreciation of the work done by police leading to the arrest and conviction" of Woolliscroft's murderer.

While incarcerated within HM Prison Coldingley, Hart converted to Christianity. In the 1990s, he volunteered to participate in a government educational scheme devised to educate secondary school children, young adults and others—typically juveniles either deemed at risk of becoming career criminals or already involved in criminal activity—about the harsh realities of life in prison in efforts to deter them from pursuing or maintaining criminal lifestyles. This initiative gradually evolved into the KeepOut Project; a criminal diversion project which involves inmates travelling under supervision to venues across South East England to discuss their criminal past, the impact and cost their criminal lifestyle has had upon themselves, their families, those affected by their actions, and society in general in addition to illustrating the current realities and restrictions of inmates' daily lives.

Following Woolliscroft's murder, a memorial plaque dedicated to her memory was unveiled inside the Richmond branch of Barclays Bank where she had died. The inscription upon the plaque reads: "In fond memory of Angela Woolliscroft who died on 10th November 1976. A member of staff of this branch who will always be remembered by her colleagues."

The suburban Richmond branch of Barclays Bank closed in June 2014. Following discussions with Woolliscroft's relatives, the memorial plaque was transferred to a Barclays Bank in George Street, Richmond where, on each anniversary of her death, flowers are placed on a table below the commemorative plaque. The location upon Upper Ham Road where the suburban Richmond branch of Barclays Bank once stood is now a Sainsbury's store. One of the four memorial benches also dedicated to Woolliscroft's memory following her murder remains outside the building; the three others were simultaneously installed at Ham Common in August 1977.

Angela Woolliscroft

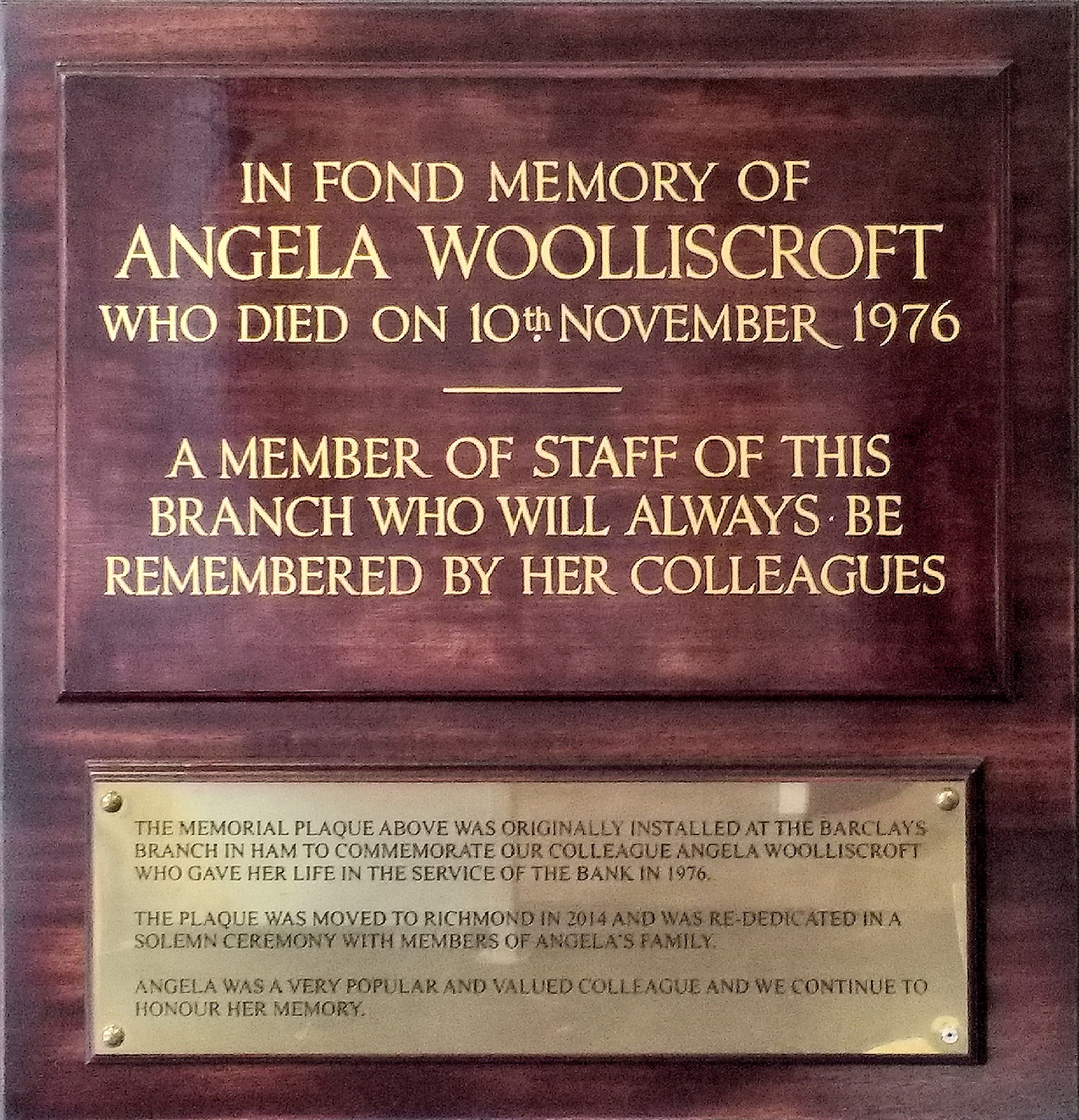
The George Street, Richmond memorial plaque to Angela Woolliscroft

The commemorative memorial to Angela Woolliscroft, pictured on the fiftieth anniversary of her death

== Media ==
=== Bibliography ===
- Edwards, Jeff (1992). "Bank Raid Murder". Real-Life Crimes (6). London: Eaglemoss Publications Ltd.: 129–134. ISBN 978-1-858-75014-9.
- Honeycombe, Gordon (2014). Dark Secrets of the Black Museum: 1835–1985. London: John Blake Publishing Ltd. ISBN 978-1-782-19904-5.
- Lane, Brian (1995) [1993]. Chronicle of 20th Century Murder. Wiltshire: Select Editions. pp. 256–258. ISBN 978-0-425-14649-1.

=== Television ===
- The BBC Two television series Indelible Evidence has broadcast an episode focusing upon the Ham bank murder. This episode, titled Gunlore, was first broadcast on 6 February 1987.

== See also ==
- Bulletproof glass – Projectile-resistant transparent armor
- Crime in London
- Firearms regulation in the United Kingdom
- Forensic ballistics – Science of the motion of projectiles
- Gun violence in the United Kingdom
- Tension (physics) – Pulling force transmitted axially

== Cited works and further reading ==
- Evans, Colin (1996). The Casebook of Forensic Detection: How Science Solved 100 of the World's Most Baffling Crimes. New York City: John Wiley & Sons Inc. ISBN 978-0-471-07650-6.
- Gaute, J. H. H.; Odell, Robin (1986). Murder Whereabouts. London: George G. Harrap and Co. ISBN 978-0-245-54258-9.
- Innes, Brian (1994). Real-Life Crimes and How They Were Solved: Shreds of Evidence. Oxford: Chancellor Press. ISBN 978-1-851-52594-2.
- Kelland, Gilbert (1996). Crime in London. London: Grafton. ISBN 978-0-261-66909-3.
- Lane, Brian (2004). Chronicle of Murder: A Dark and Bloody History of Our Age. London: Robinson Publishing. ISBN 978-1-841-19765-4.
- Moss, Alan; Skinner, Keith (2015). Scotland Yard's History of Crime in 100 Objects. Cheltenham: History Press. ISBN 978-0-750-96655-9.
- Nash, Jay Robert (1989). Encyclopedia of World Crime: D-J. London: Bloomsbury Academic. ISBN 978-0-923-58202-9.
- Tullett, Thomas (1979). Strictly Murder: Famous Cases of Scotland Yard's Murder Squad. London: Bodley Head Publishing. ISBN 978-0-370-30097-9.
- Whitaker, Joseph (1978). An Almanack for the Year of Our Lord 1978. Ann Arbor: University of Michigan. ASIN B0014IXSO2.
- Wilson, Colin (2015). Written in Blood. New York: Diversion Books. ISBN 978-1-626-81868-2.
