= Christ's School =

Secondary school in Richmond, London, England

Coordinates: 51.4588°N 0.2881°W

Location
- Queens Road; Richmond, Greater London, TW10 6HW; England

Information
- Type: Voluntary aided school
- Religious affiliation: Church of England
- Established: 1713; 313 years ago
- Local authority: Richmond upon Thames
- Department for Education URN: 102929 Tables
- Ofsted: Reports
- Headteacher: Helen Dixon
- Gender: Coeducational
- Age: 11 to 19

Christ's School is a Church of England secondary school in Richmond, London, located very near Richmond Park. It is the only Church of England secondary school in the London Borough of Richmond upon Thames. Around 670 pupils, between the ages of 11 and 19, attend the school.

== Performance ==
As with other schools, latest exam results and related data are published in the Department for Education's national tables.

== History ==
The school's origins date back to 1658 when John Frederick Bentley, a local businessman and justice of the peace, offered to build a school at his own expense. However, the school was not formally established until 25 May 1713, when a number of well-intentioned citizens of Richmond, headed by Queen Anne, agreed to subscribe towards "The setting up of a Charity School in the Parish of Richmond, for teaching poor children to read, and instructing them in the knowledge and practice of Christian religion as professed and taught in the Church of England."

The original school building was located at the corner of George Street and Brewer's Lane and was attached to the local parish church of St Mary Magdalene. It was informally known as a bluecoat school as the pupils were then provided with blue gowns – a tradition carried on with the current uniform of blue blazers.

In 1854, the school moved to a bigger building at the junction of Eton Street and Paradise Road. A century later this was considered too small and ill-equipped by the standards of the Education Act 1944, so the school moved to new buildings in 1960 and was then known as St Mary Magdalene Church of England School.

The school had links with St Edward the Confessor RC school which had opened in 1954. The two schools ran a joint sixth form during the late 1960s but this proved to be a short-lived experiment. In 1978, St Edward the Confessor RC School merged with the St Mary Magdalene School to form Christs School under the headship of Mr Baker. This was one of the first ecumenical (RC and C of E) maintained church schools in England.

In 1997, by mutual agreement, the Roman Catholic Church withdrew from the management arrangement and Christ's School returned to being a Church of England maintained secondary school.

The school was re-launched in September 2000 on the old East side building (the original St Mary's site), which was considerably refurbished and expanded with art and textile rooms technical block housing science laboratories, design and technology workshops and a food tech room, as well as a full-size sports hall. The West side building (the original St Edward's site) was sold off and is now a gated housing development and a primary school.

Notable students include Grammy Award-winner, singer/rapper Estelle Swaray, four Premiership football players (Jason Roberts, Nathan Ellington, Clinton Morrison and Jody Morris), and Professor John Alcolado (Head of Division of Medical Sciences and Graduate Entry Medicine, University of Nottingham).

== Source ==
https://web.archive.org/web/20091115083739/http://www.christs.richmond.sch.uk/page.php?pageID=7
