= Gosling & Sons =

Former department store in London

Coordinates: 51.460028°N 0.306228°W

Gosling & Sons Limited
- Type: Private company
- Industry: Retail
- Genre: Department store
- Founded: 1795
- Defunct: 1974
- Fate: Purchased by John Barker & Co in 1947, which was purchased by House of Fraser in 1957. Store was destroyed by Fire.
- Successor: Dickins & Jones
- Headquarters: Richmond, London
- Parent: 1947-1957 John Barker & Co; House of Fraser 1957-1974

Gosling & Sons was a draper that became a department store that opened on George Street in Richmond, London in 1795. The store was firstly purchased by John Barker & Co, before becoming part of the House of Fraser group.

== History and description ==
Gosling & Sons' new building in 1905

Gosling & Sons was opened in 1795 at 80 George Street as Gosling's Drapery by John Hunt Gosling. Its operations gradually expanded beyond its original listing as a linen draper, and with it the premises expanded too. John Hunt Gosling died in 1886 with his sons taking over the firm before their deaths at the end of the 19th century after which the family lost its interests in the firm. A large expansion was carried out around the turn of the 20th century, where it enveloped a number of properties on the west of Golden Court.

In 1947 the store was acquired by John Barker & Co Ltd, which itself was purchased by House of Fraser in 1957. Following a significant fire in the 1962 the store was demolished in 1968. The land was transferred to Dickens & Jones, another store within House of Fraser's group, who constructed a new store on the site. The original Gosling & Co company was eventually dissolved in 1974. In 2007 the store was renamed as a House of Fraser which was closed in 2020 to be refurbished and reopened as a mixed-use development known as "The Gosling".
