= Richmond Theatre (London) =

Theatre in England

- 1899 Richmond Theatre and Opera House; 1902 Prince of Wales; 1908 Richmond Hippodrome; Theatre Royal, Richmond; Theatre on the Green
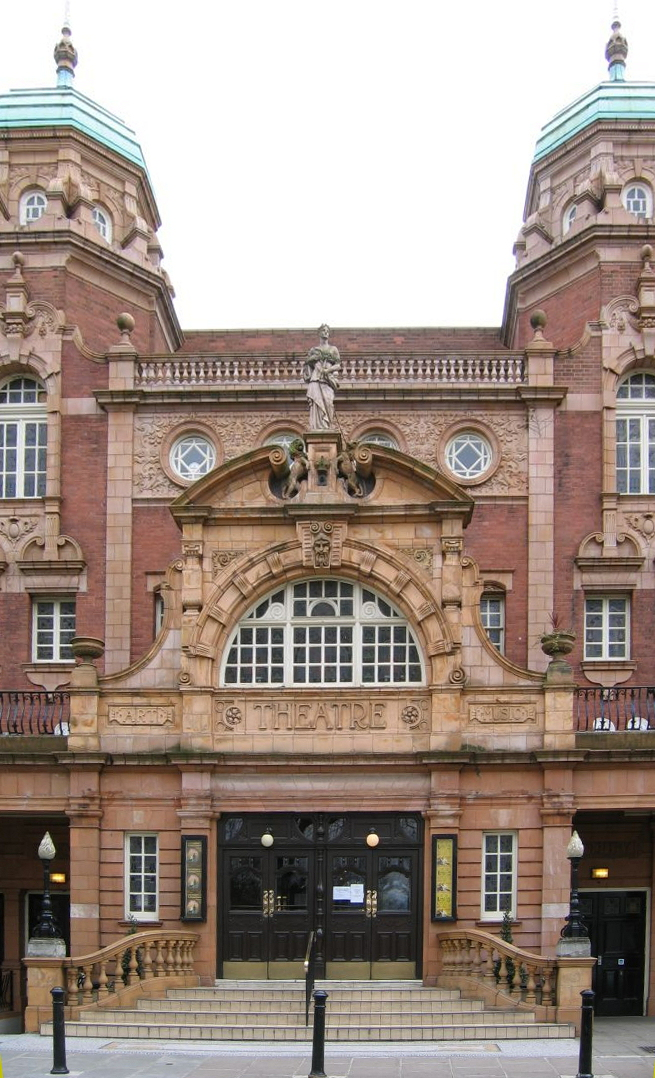
- Interactive map of Richmond Theatre
- Location: Richmond, London, England
- Coordinates: 51.4620°N 0.3038°W
- Owner: ATG Entertainment
- Capacity: 840
- Type: Provincial
- Designation: Grade II*
- Public transit: Richmond

Construction
- Opened: 18 September 1899
- Architect: Frank Matcham

Website
- Richmond Theatre website at Ambassador Theatre Group

Listed Building – Grade II*
- Official name: Richmond Theatre
- Designated: 28 June 1972
- Reference no.: 1065384

The present Richmond Theatre, in the London Borough of Richmond upon Thames, is a British Victorian theatre located on Little Green, adjacent to Richmond Green. It opened on 18 September 1899 with a performance of As You Like It. One of the finest surviving examples of the work of theatre architect Frank Matcham, the building, in red brick with buff terracotta, is listed Grade II* by Historic England. John Earl, writing in 1982, described it as "[o]f outstanding importance as the most completely preserved Matcham theatre in Greater London and one of his most satisfying interiors."

== History ==
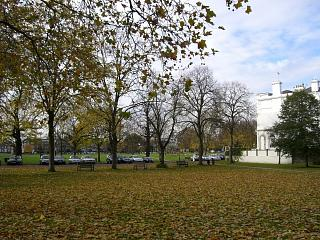
Little Green, with Richmond Green seen in the distance

The theatre, originally known as the Theatre Royal and Opera House, is structured into the familiar stalls, dress and upper circles, with four boxes at dress level. The auditorium is a mixture of gilt detailing and red plush fabrics, covering seats and front of circles. Its interior and exterior has been used as a movie set in many films (e.g. Evita, Topsy-Turvy, standing in for the Victorian Savoy Theatre, Finding Neverland—doubling as the Duke of York's Theatre, National Treasure: Book of Secrets—setting of Ford's Theatre) and TV programmes (e.g. Jonathan Creek).

A new theatre company was formed in January 1950, with Oliver Gordon as resident producer. Members of the company included Martin Wyldeck, Peter Wyngarde, Raymond Francis, and Melanie Paul.

In the early 1990s, the theatre underwent a major overhaul, overseen by the designer Carl Toms. This included a side extension giving more space for the audience and included a 'Matcham Room', today known as the Ambassador Lounge. The driving force behind the renovation of the theatre was Sally Greene, with strong support from Richmond upon Thames Council through its chief executive, Richard Harbord and Community Services Committee chairman Serge Lourie.

The theatre is now part of ATG Entertainment and has a weekly schedule of plays and musicals, alongside special music events and children's shows. Pre-West End productions can often be seen. There is a Christmas and New Year pantomime tradition and many of Britain's greatest music hall and pantomime performers have appeared there. The theatre also offers a range of creative learning activities for adults and children, including drama, creative writing and singing.

January 2013 saw Richmond Theatre extend access in the community when Suzanne Shaw and Tim Vine starred in the pantomime Aladdin, by offering its first relaxed performance as part of a pilot scheme initiated by ATG.

In 2016, the theatre was honoured with the People's Choice Award at The Richmond Business Awards.

== Sources ==
- Earl, John; Sell, Michael (2000). Guide to British Theatres 1750–1950, pp. 134–5, Theatres Trust. ISBN 0-7136-5688-3
