= Britannia, Richmond =

Coordinates: 51°27′39″N 0°18′19″W

The Britannia
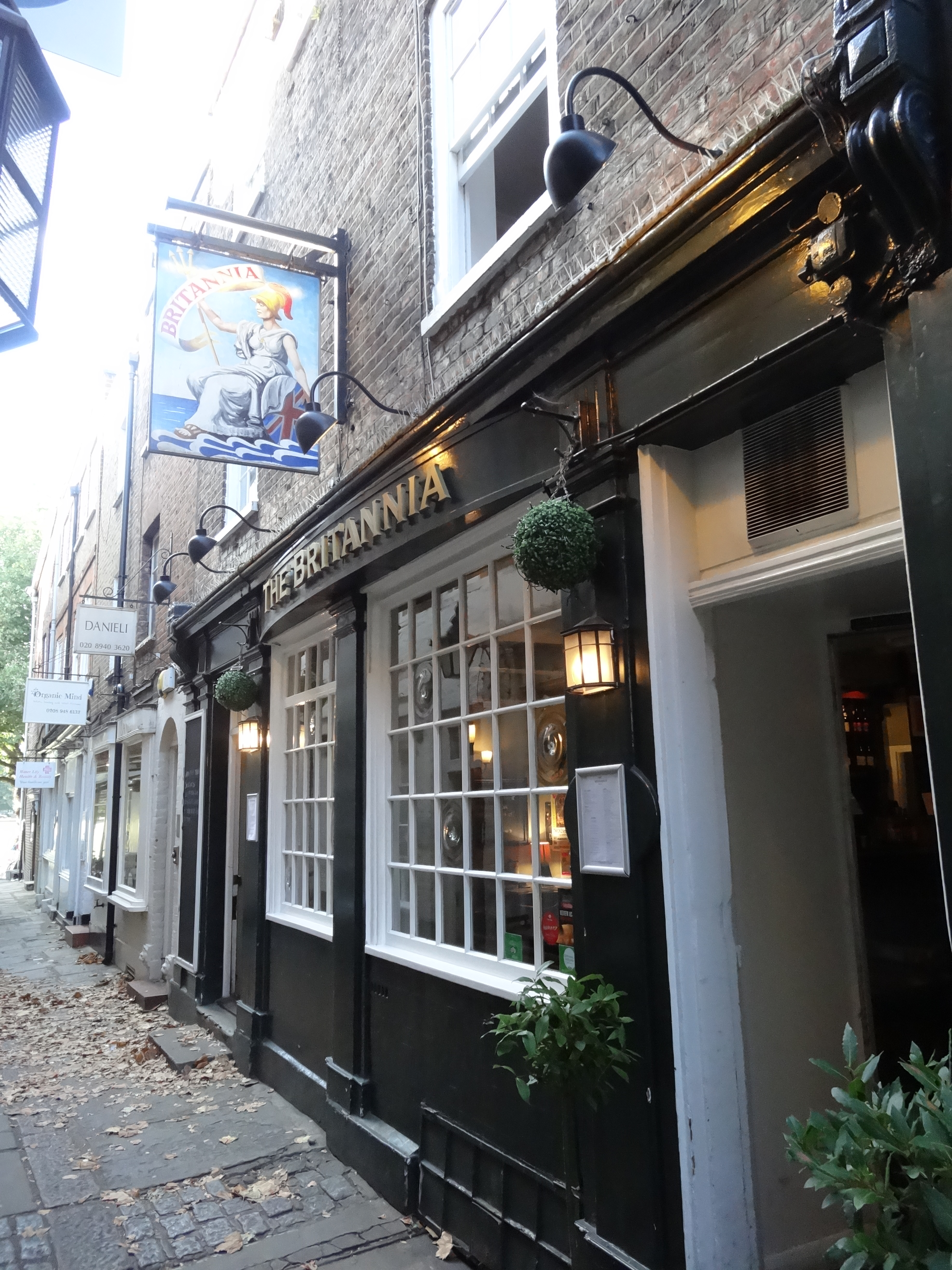

- Location within London Borough of Richmond upon Thames

General information
- Type: Public house
- Location: 5 Brewers Lane, Richmond, London, England

Listed Building – Grade II
- Official name: Britannia public house
- Designated: 25 June 1983
- Reference no.: 1358054

The Britannia is a Grade II listed public house at 5 Brewers Lane, Richmond, in the London Borough of Richmond upon Thames.

It was built in the 18th century, and the architect is not known.
