= Maids of Honour Row =

Georgian Terrace in London

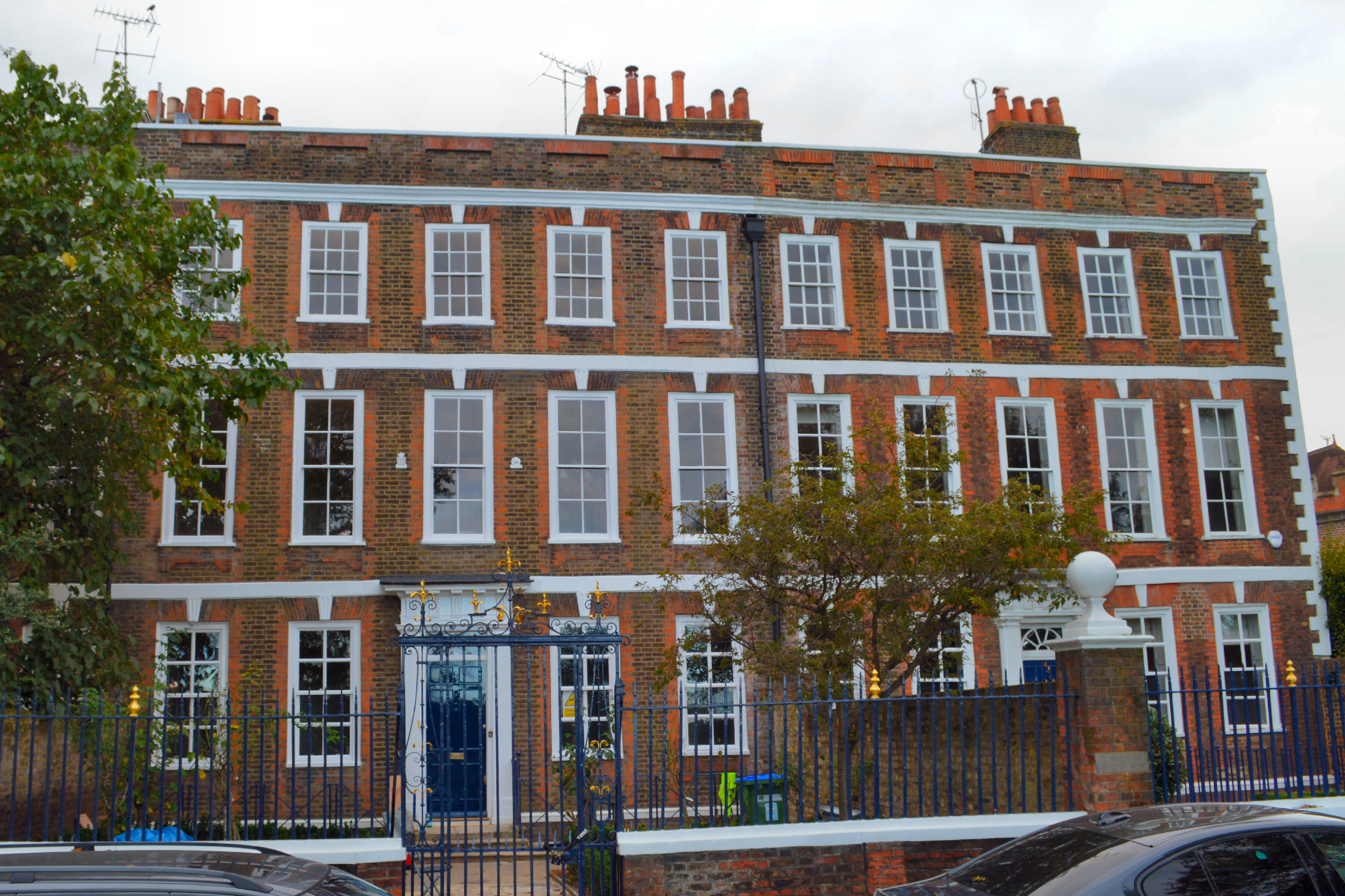
- Houses 3 and 4, Maids of Honour Row

General information
- Type: Residential
- Location: Richmond, London, England
- Coordinates: 51.4610°N 0.3083°W
- Year built: c. 1717

Listed Building – Grade I
- Official name: 1-4, Maids of Honour Row
- Designated: 10 January 1950
- Reference no.: 1065317

Maids of Honour Row is a Grade I listed Georgian terrace on the south-western side of Richmond Green in Richmond, London, England. The houses are listed alongside their original gates and railings for their exceptional design and preservation, largely appearing as they would have originally.

== Description ==
Maids of Honour Row is celebrated as "one of the finest examples of a Georgian terrace in the country" and represents a design established by the Rebuilding of London Act 1666 of houses fronting onto "streets of note". It is built mostly in brick, with stone quoins and band courses, as well as other ornamental details. House no. 4 also has a largely restored interior including an entrance decorated with painted panels by Antonio Joli for the Swiss-born British impresario John James Heidegger.

== History ==
Construction on the terrace began around 1717 on the grounds of the former Richmond Palace of which the gatehouse, a short distance away, is one of the last remaining structures. The terrace is named after the maids of honour of Queen Caroline, who with her husband the Prince of Wales, later George II, stayed at the nearby Richmond Lodge. Traditionally the terrace was considered to have been built for the purpose of housing the maids of honour, although there is contrary evidence that they were built speculatively before George's arrival, possibly in anticipation of it. The connection was more surely established shortly after construction began, as two of the houses would start being rented by George for the accommodation of the maids of honour. Other notable residents include William Capel, 3rd Earl of Essex, Edward Croft Murray, Richard Burton, Charles Garvice, Henrietta Vansitart, Judith Levy, the "Queen of Richmond Green" and the previously mentioned John James Heidegger.
