= George Street, Richmond =

Street in Richmond, London

Coordinates: 51°27′37.44″N 0°18′18.72″W

George Street

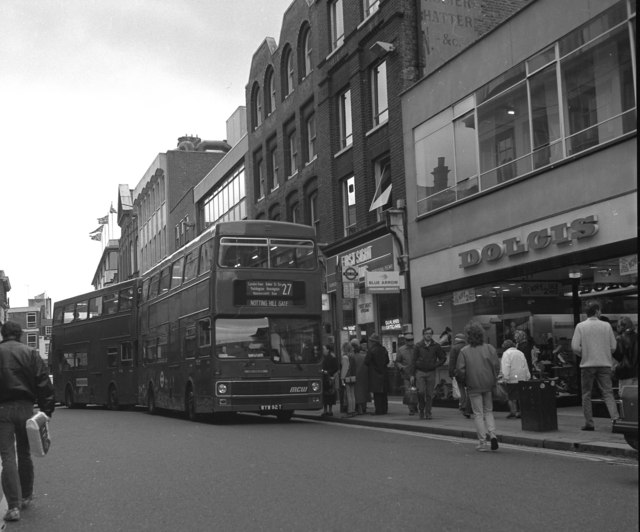
- George Street in 1988
- Interactive map of George Street
- Location: Richmond, London, England, United Kingdom
- Postal code: TW10
- Nearest National Rail, London Overground, London Underground station: Richmond railway station

Other
- Known for: It was one of the first streets to be developed in Richmond and is the town's high street

George Street, at the confluence of the A305 and A307 roads, is the high street in Richmond, London and was one of the first streets to be developed in the town. Previously known as Great Street, it was renamed after King George III in 1769. Buildings on the street include the Grade II listed Greyhound House, formerly the Greyhound Hotel, in a building dating from the 1730s.

== 1790s ==
No. 80 George Street was the site of the department store J H Gosling & Sons, founded as a drapers by John Hunt Gosling in 1796. The site expanded to include Nos. 75-79. It was taken over by John Barker & Co. in 1947 and was acquired by House of Fraser in 1957. The building was demolished in 1968 after being damaged in a fire. The store reopened as Dickins & Jones on completion of a new building in 1970, and was renamed House of Fraser in 2007. It closed in 2020 and is undergoing redevelopment.

== 1890s ==
The facade of the former General Post Office building at Nos. 70–72, now a retail store, incorporates the coat of arms of the former Municipal Borough of Richmond, which existed from 1890 to 1965.

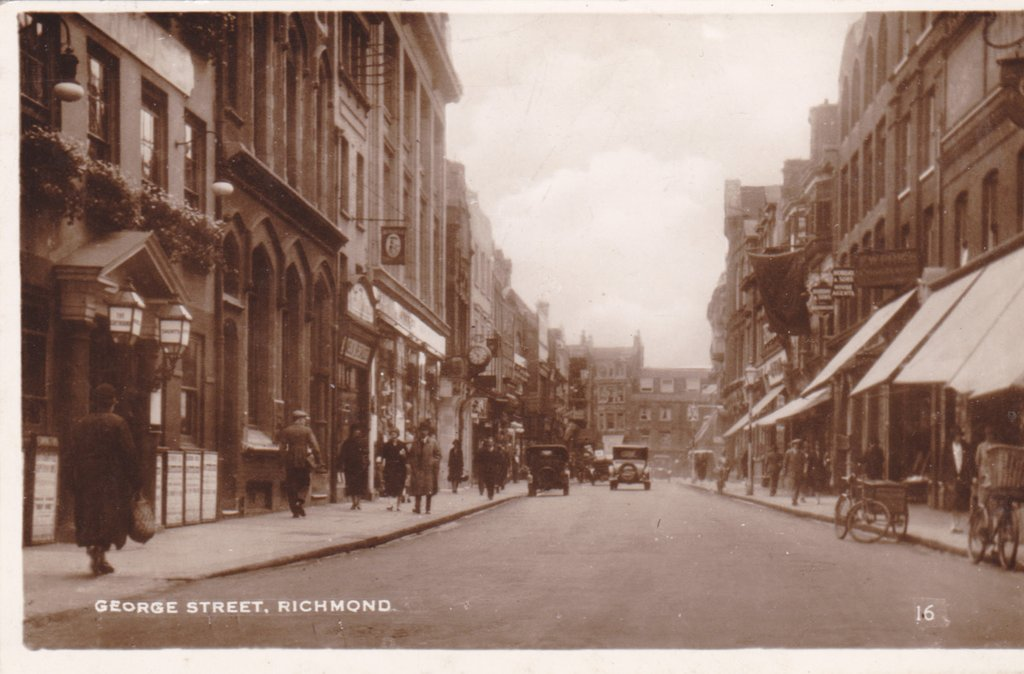
George Street in the 1930s

No. 29, now a Tesco Metro, was built in 1896 by the brothers Alfred and Harold Wright as a drapers shop. It developed into the first department store in Richmond, Wright Brothers Ltd, in 1929. Wright Brothers was purchased by Hide & Co Ltd, of Kingston, in 1940; they were taken over by House of Fraser in 1975, and the department store was sold to Owen Owen in 1976 and closed in 1990.

The street is one-way eastbound. Westbound traffic uses Eton Street, Paradise Road and Red Lion Street.

== Memorial plaque ==
At Barclays Bank a memorial plaque, relocated in 2014 from the bank's former branch in Ham, commemorates Angela Woolliscroft, a bank teller who was murdered in 1976 during a bank robbery at the Ham branch. It reads: "In fond memory of Angela Woolliscroft who died on 10th November 1976. A member of staff of this branch who will always be remembered by her colleagues."

== Gallery ==
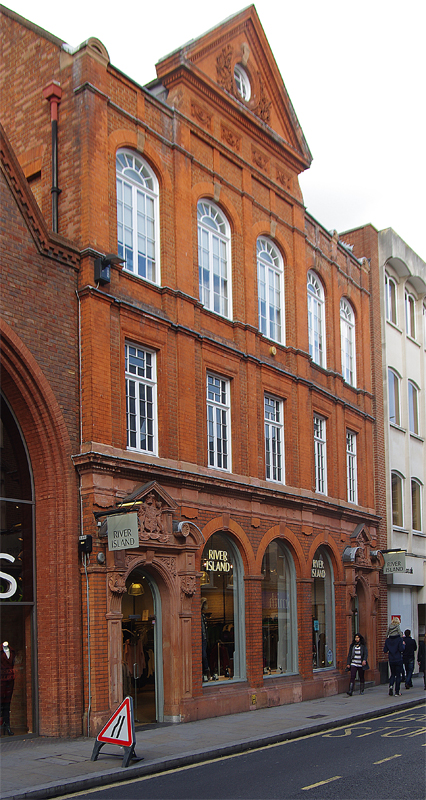
Former Post Office building on George Street

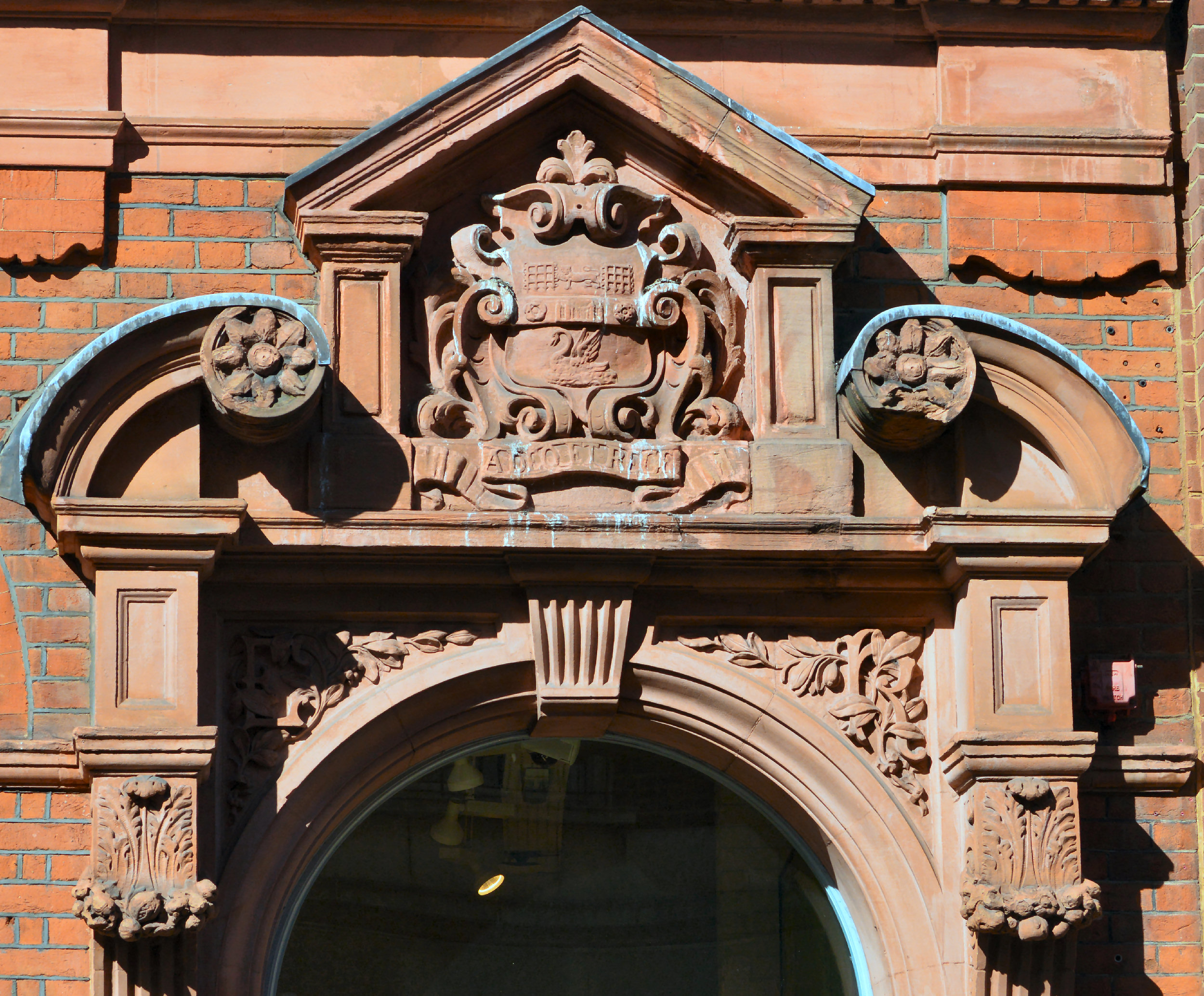
Facade of the Post Office building, showing the coat of arms of the former Municipal Borough of Richmond

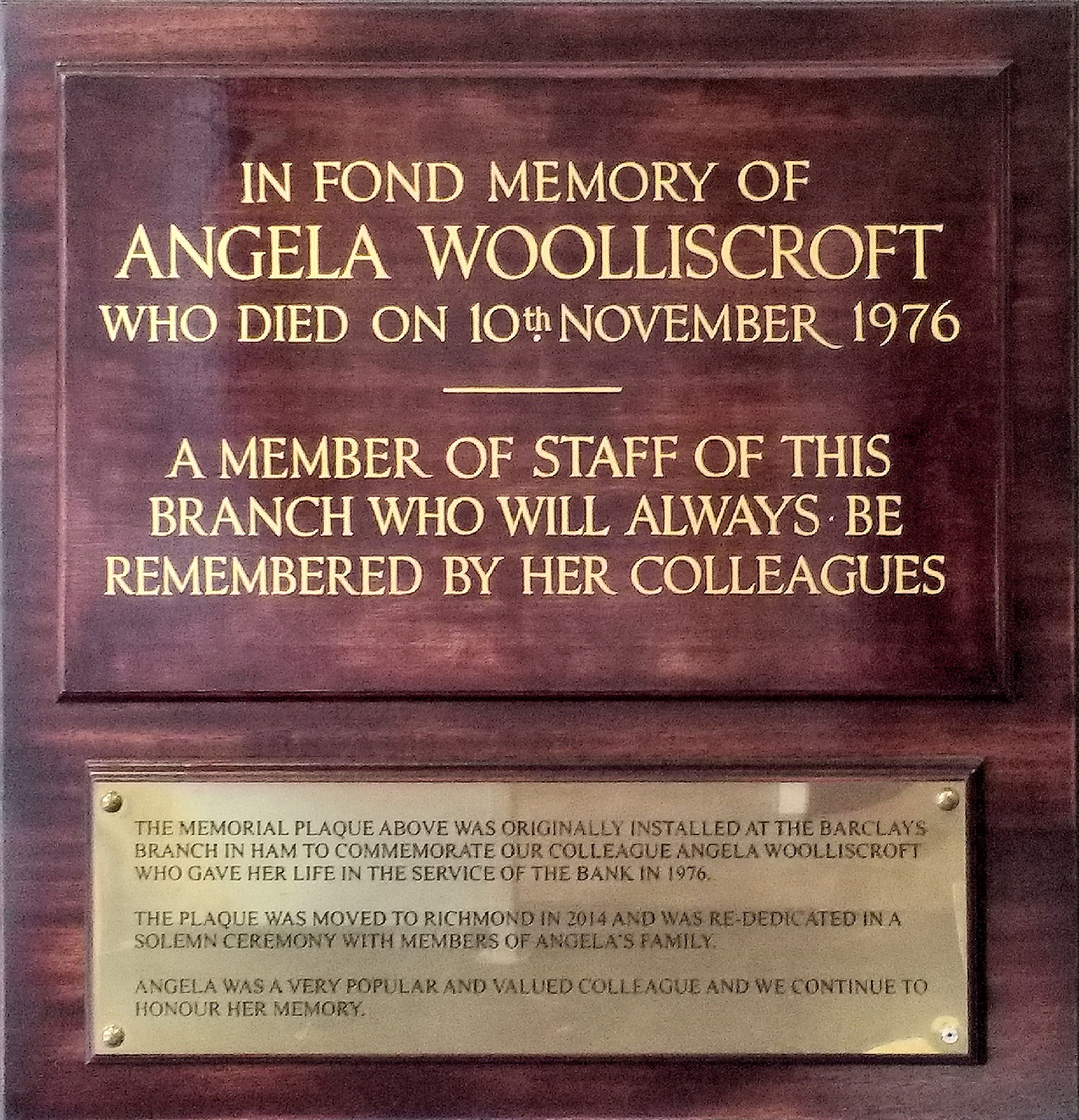
Memorial plaque paying tribute to bank teller Angela Woolliscroft, murdered in 1976 during a robbery at Barclays Bank's branch in Ham

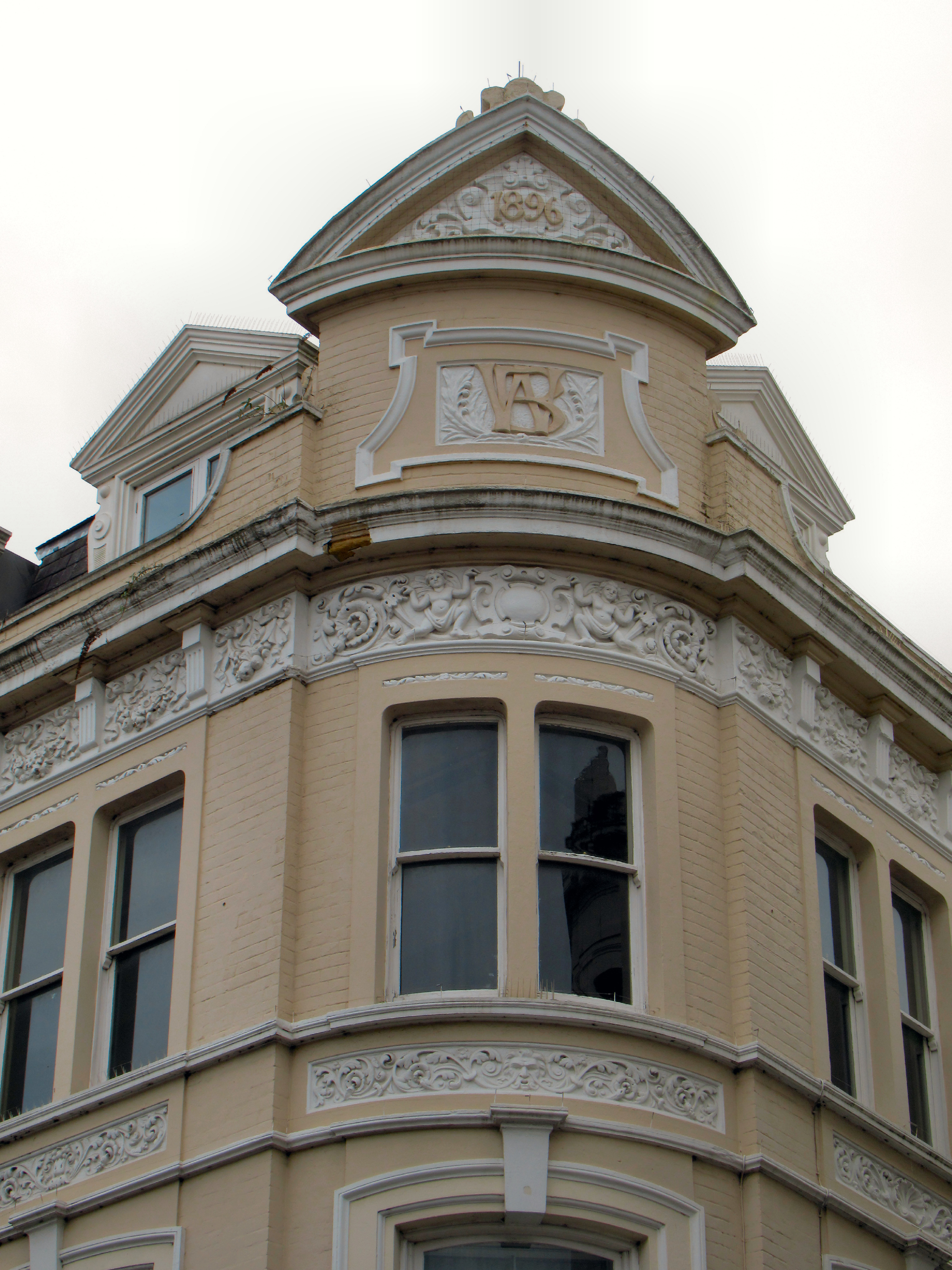
Corner of the former Wright Brothers building
