= Richmond Green =

Park in Richmond, London, England

Coordinates: 51°27′42″N 0°18′25″W

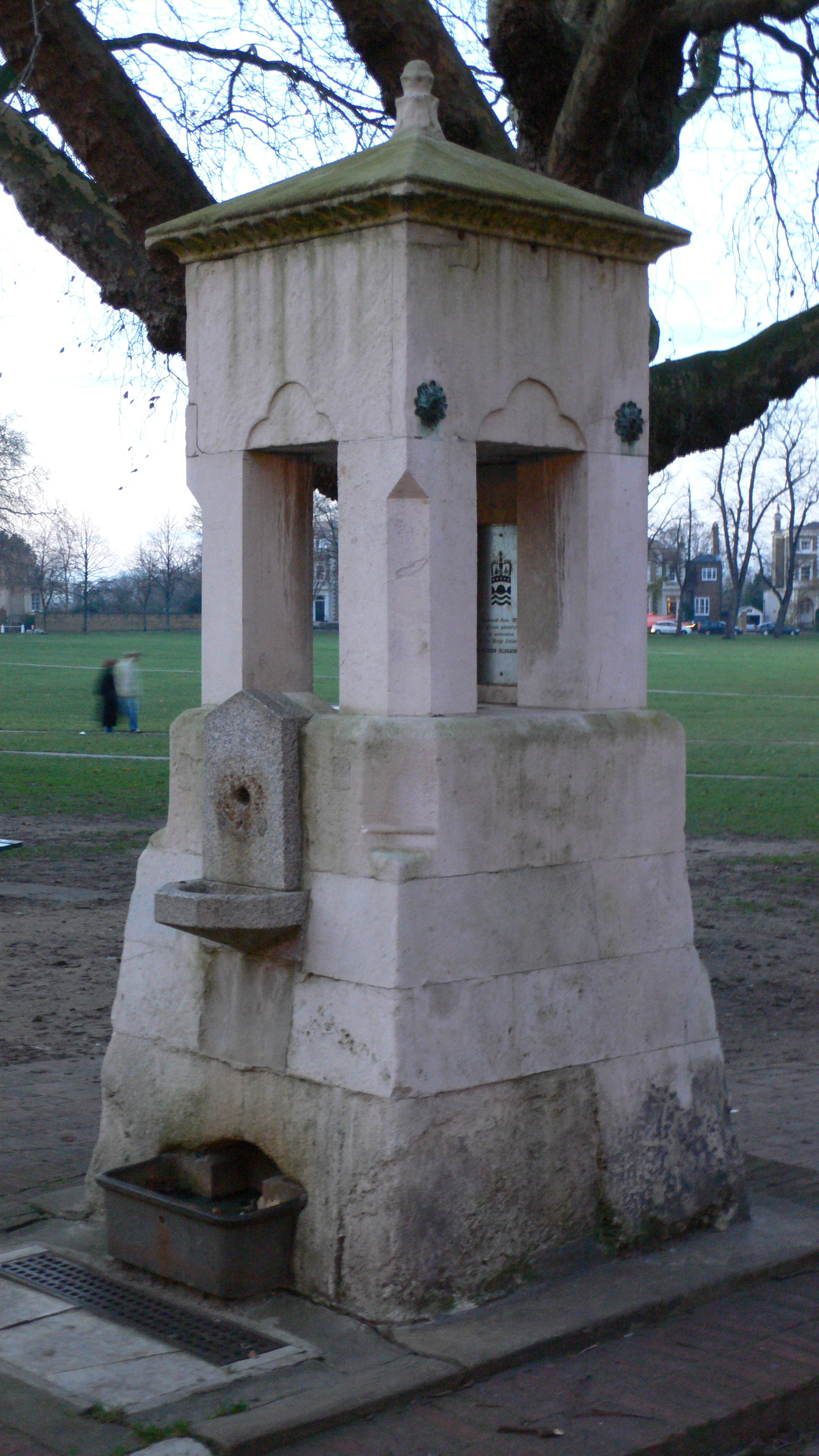
- Grade II listed drinking fountain on Richmond Green
- Interactive map of Richmond Green
- Type: Village green
- Location: London
- Area: 12 acres (4.9 ha)
- Operator: London Borough of Richmond upon Thames
- Status: Open all year

Richmond Green is a recreation area near the centre of Richmond, England, a town of about 20,000 inhabitants situated in south-west London. Owned by the Crown Estate, it is leased to the London Borough of Richmond upon Thames. The Green, which has been described as "one of the most beautiful urban greens surviving anywhere in England", is roughly square in shape and its open grassland, framed with broadleaf trees, extends to roughly twelve acres (5 hectares). On the north-east side there is also a smaller open space called Little Green. Richmond Green and Little Green are overlooked by a mixture of period townhouses, historic buildings and municipal and commercial establishments including the Richmond Lending Library and Richmond Theatre.

On summer weekends and public holidays the Green attracts many residents and visitors. It has a long history of hosting sporting events: from the 16th century onwards tournaments and archery contests have taken place on the Green, while cricket matches have been played since the mid-18th century, continuing to the present day.

== History and description ==
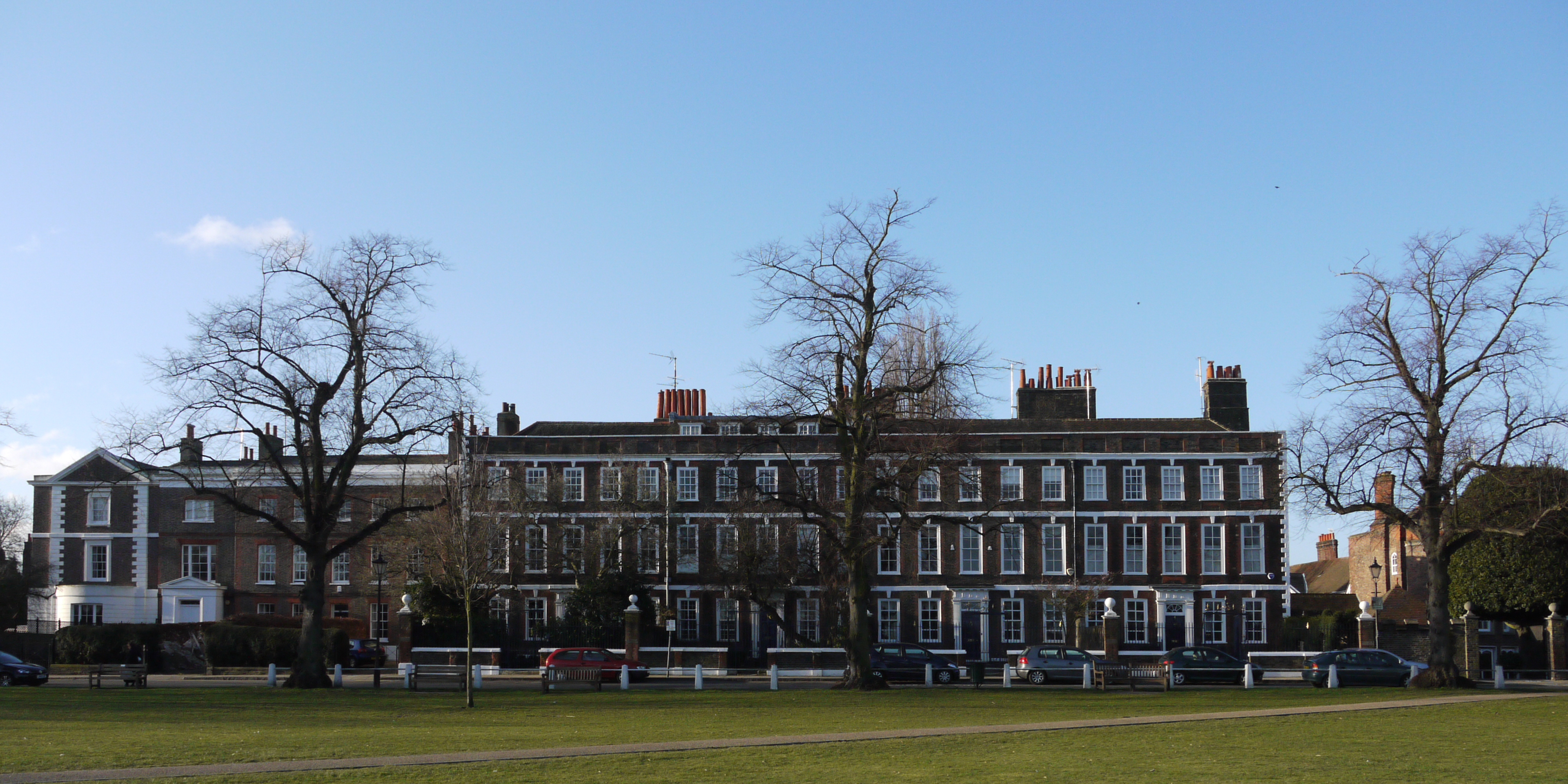
Maids of Honour Row

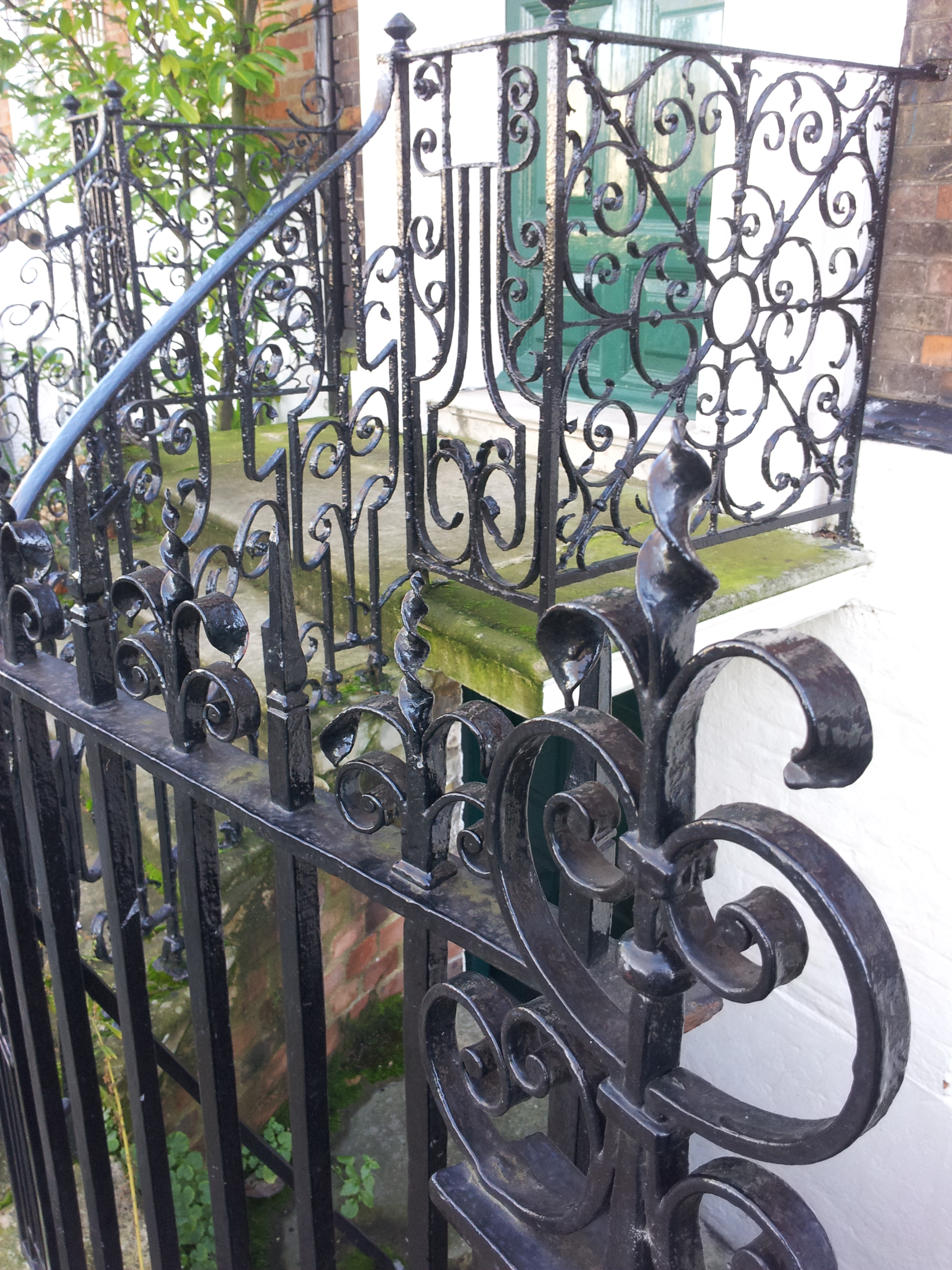
Grade II* listed ornamental iron railings at 11, Richmond Green

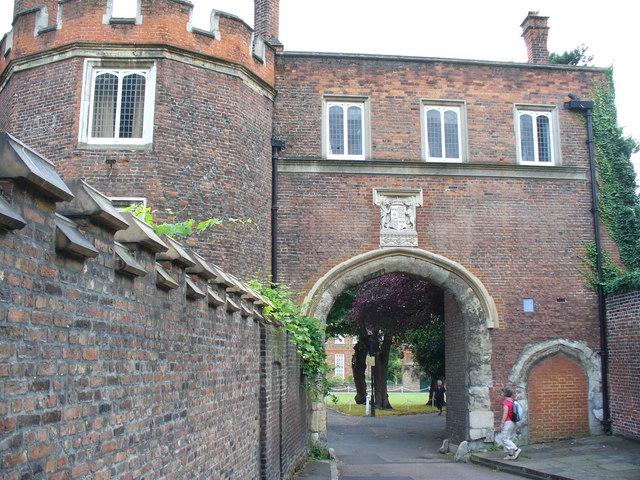
Richmond Palace Gate House, which is Grade I listed

Jousting tournaments took place on Richmond Green in the Middle Ages, when English monarchs were living in or visiting what is now called Richmond. For over 400 years, Richmond Green has been edged by houses and commercial premises – built to provide accommodation for people serving or visiting Richmond Palace. In 1625 Charles I brought his court here to escape the plague in London and by the early 18th century these had become the homes of "minor nobility, diplomats, and court hangers-on".

The construction of the railway in the mid-19th century cut the Green off from Old Deer Park, and led to the building of Victorian villas for the more prosperous commuters to London. The A316 road, built in the early 20th century, worsened this separation.

Today the northern, western and southern sides of the Green are residential while the eastern side, linking with Richmond's high street, George Street, is largely retail and commercial. Public buildings line the eastern side of Little Green and pubs and cafés cluster in the corner by Paved Court and Golden Court – two of a number of alleys that lead from the Green to George Street. These alleys are lined with mostly privately owned boutiques.

To the west of the Green is Old Palace Lane, running gently down to the river. Adjoining to the left is the renowned terrace of well-preserved three-storey houses known as Maids of Honour Row. These were built in 1724 for the maids of honour (trusted royal wardrobe servants) of Queen Caroline, the queen consort of George II. As a child, Richard Burton, the Victorian explorer, lived at number 2.

== Buildings ==
Richmond Green, usually "The Green", is also a street address. Numbers 1–6, 11–12 and 32, Richmond Green are all Grade II* listed. Numbers 7–10 Richmond Green are all Grade II listed, as are nos 14–18, 21–25 and 29–31. The ornamental iron railings at no 11 are Grade II* listed. 8, Richmond Green, is the location of the Richmond Charities, which manages Richmond's almshouses. The Cricketers public house is between 24, Richmond Green and 25, Richmond Green. Another public house, The Prince's Head, is at 28, Richmond Green.

Next to No. 33 is a row of six terraced houses, known as Old Palace Terrace. All seven houses are Grade II* listed. Number 5 was the home of James Stephen Rigaud, Assistant Observer at the King's Observatory.

The late 19th-century drinking fountain at the south corner of Richmond Green is Grade II listed. It was restored in 2021.

A pair of K6 red telephone boxes at the south corner are also Grade II listed, as is a lamp standard outside 1, Richmond Green.

The houses on the south-western side of the Green include Maids of Honour Row. The houses, and their gates and railings, at nos 1–4 Maids of Honour Row are Grade I listed. The Wardrobe and the Gate House, both Grade I listed, are surviving structures from Henry VII's Richmond Palace. The Gate House was built in 1501, and was let on a 65-year lease by the Crown Estate Commissioners in 1986. The Trumpeters' House, which is also Grade I listed, is an early 18th-century house built on the site of Richmond Palace's Middle Gate.

=== Pembroke Villas and Portland Terrace ===
The street bounding Richmond Green on the north-west is called Pembroke Villas, comprising five pairs of large semi-detached Victorian villas, formerly the site of the house of the Dutchman Sir Matthew Decker, 1st Baronet (1679–1749). It descended to his grandson Richard FitzWilliam, 7th Viscount FitzWilliam (1745–1816) of Mount Merrion, Dublin, Ireland, who named it "FitzWilliam House" and there formed his famous art collection and by his will founded the Fitzwilliam Museum in Cambridge. The monument to Sir Matthew Decker and Richard FitzWilliam survives against the external wall of St Mary Magdalene's Church, Richmond. FitzWilliam's heir was his cousin George Herbert, 11th Earl of Pembroke (1759–1827), of Wilton House in Wiltshire, who renamed the house "Pembroke House". It was demolished in 1840. Numbers 1 to 10, Pembroke Villas are Grade II listed.

The street running along the north east of the Green, where it joins Pembroke Villas, is called Portland Terrace. Numbers 1 to 4, Portland Terrace are Grade II listed.

Between Pembroke Villas and Portland Terrace is a gate that used to be the entrance to Old Deer Park and is now open only to pedestrians. Just a few yards beyond the gate, a footbridge crosses the railway to lead to Old Deer Park Car Park. Portland Terrace runs past Little Green to become Duke Street, where Duke Street Church is located.

== Cricket on the Green ==
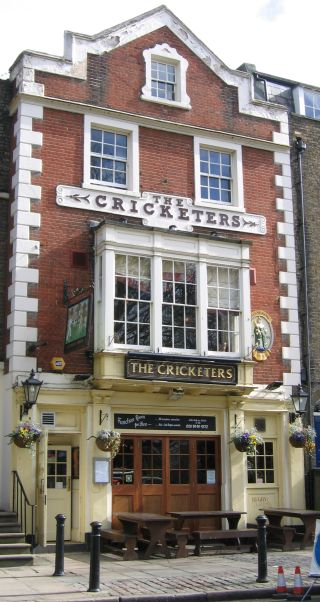
The Cricketers pub

The Green was a popular venue for cricket matches by the 18th century. The earliest reference to cricket on Richmond Green is from a letter in May 1666 by Sir Robert Paston to his wife mentioning that their son played in "a game of criquett (sic) on Richmond Green".

The Green is presently home to two village cricket teams each affiliated to a Richmond pubs, The Prince's Head and The Cricketers. Midweek matches are contested in the modern limited overs format of Twenty20 usually on a Tuesday or Thursdays, where surrounding village teams compete for the Len Smith Charity Shield.

== Richmond Green in art ==
Two watercolours by Edward Walker, made in 1942, showing nos 10, 11 and 12 Richmond Green and the south side of the Green, are in the Recording Britain collection at the Victoria and Albert Museum.

== Societies ==
The Friends of Richmond Green, an amenity action group, seek to "protect and enhance the Green for local residents, visitors and future generations".

== Gallery ==
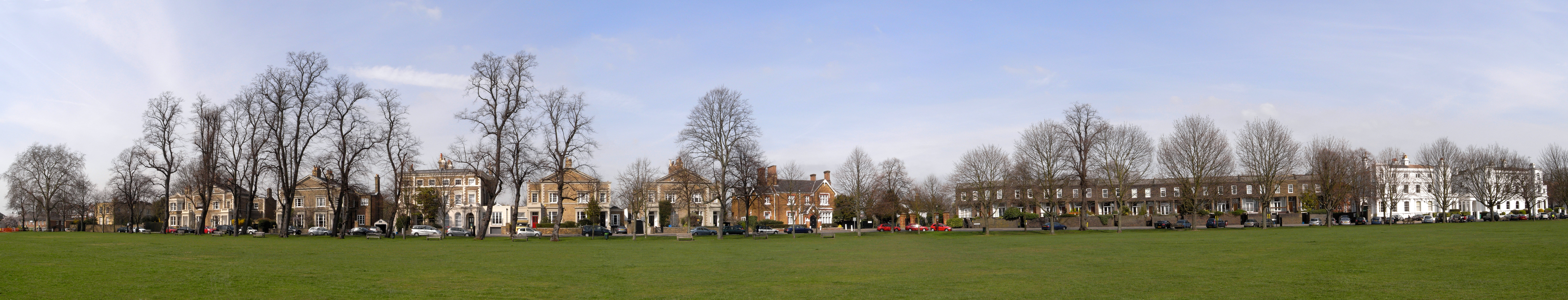
View of the northern half of Richmond Green, showing Pembroke Villas and Portland Terrace

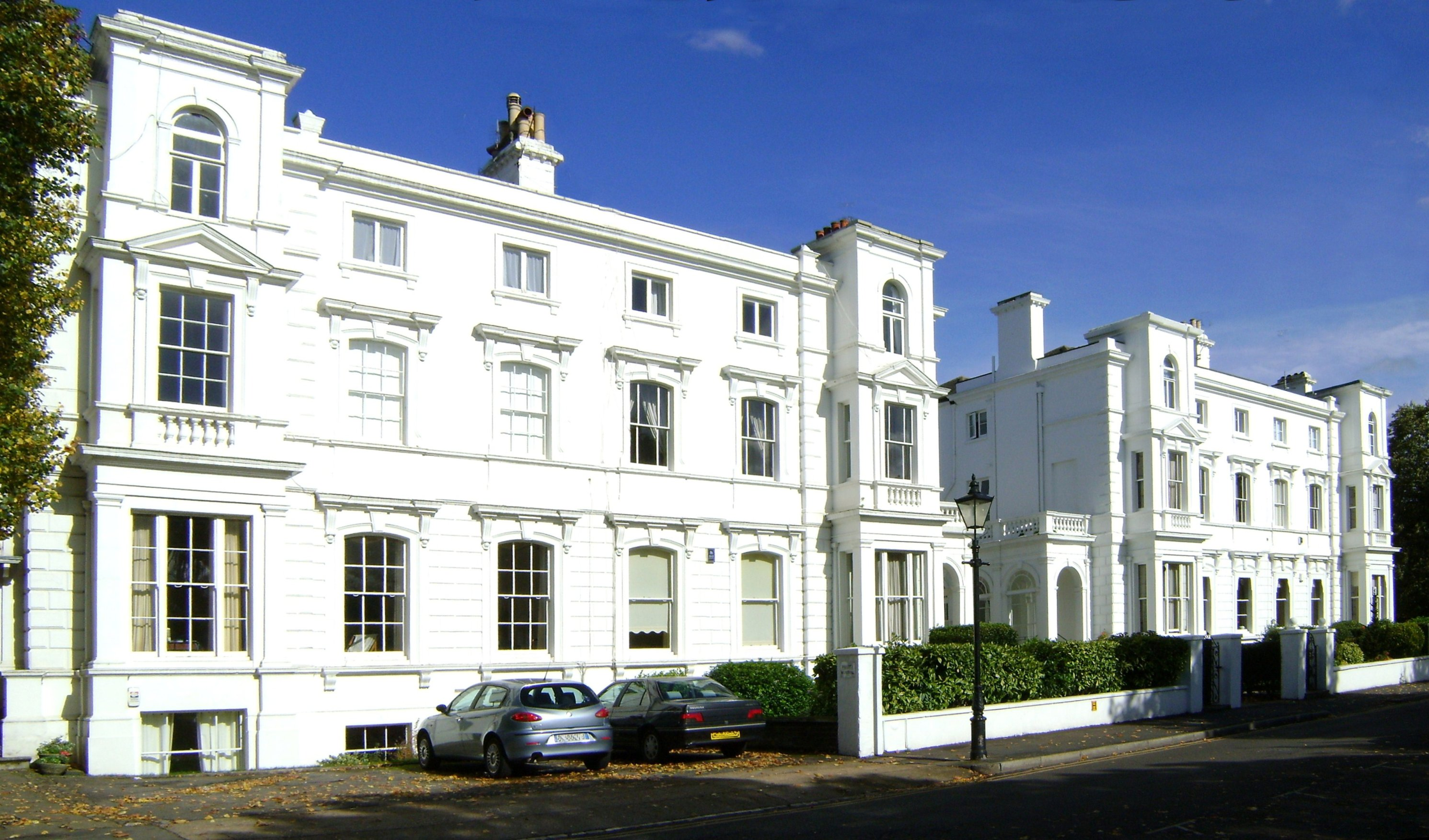
Houses on Portland Terrace

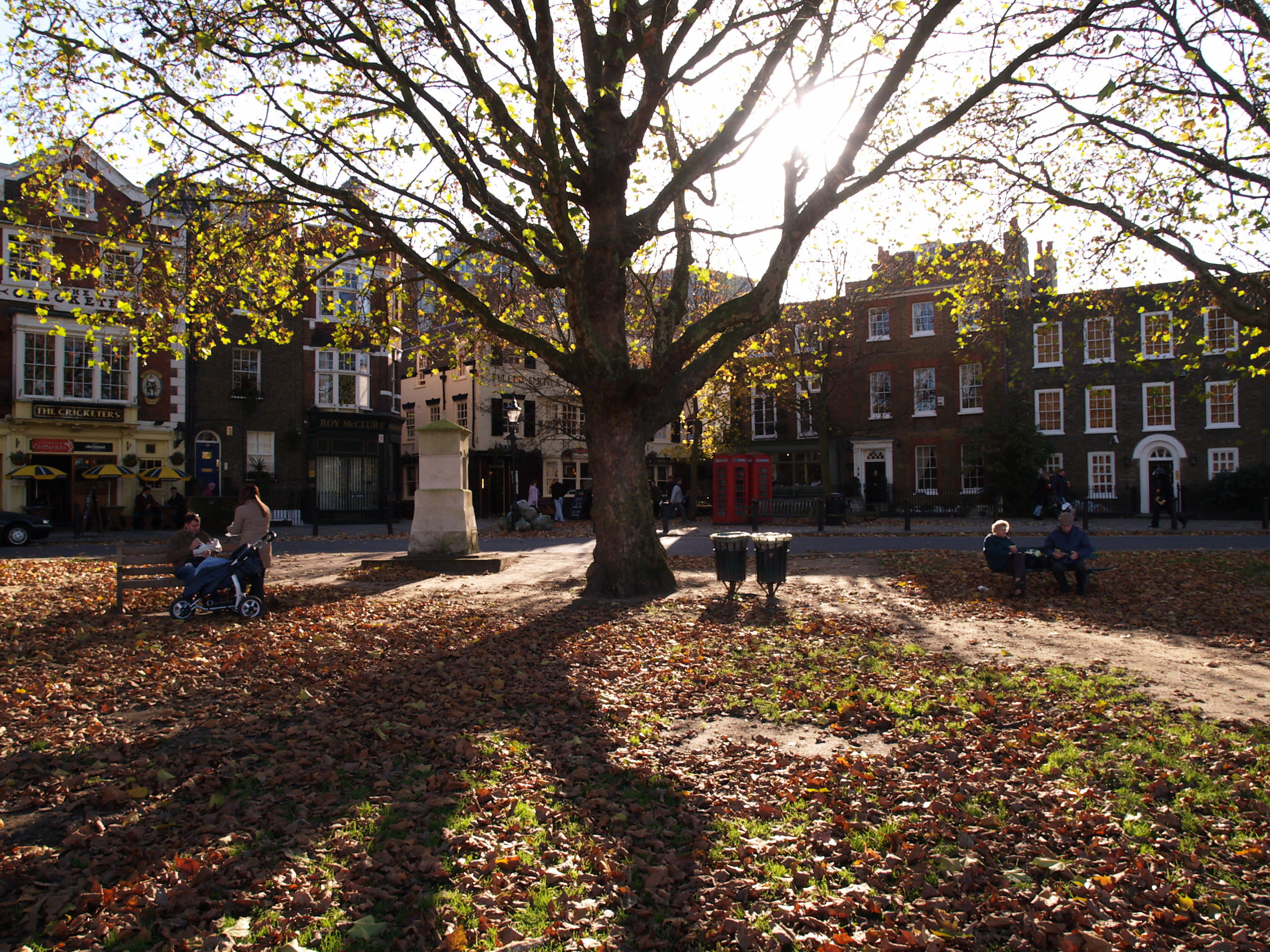
The south corner of Richmond Green

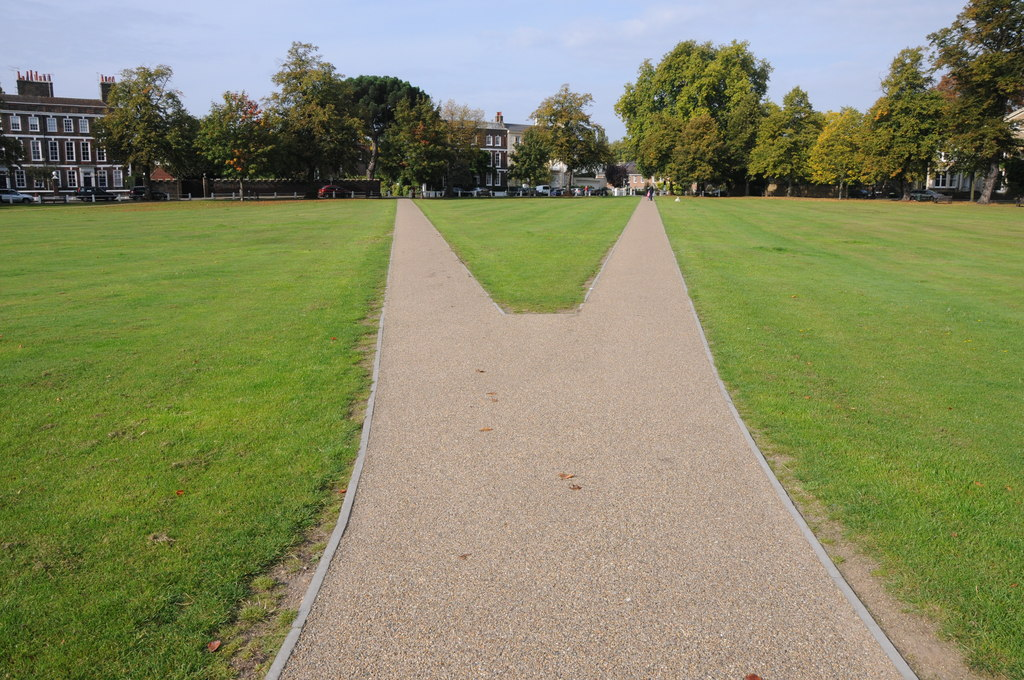
Footpaths crossing Richmond Green

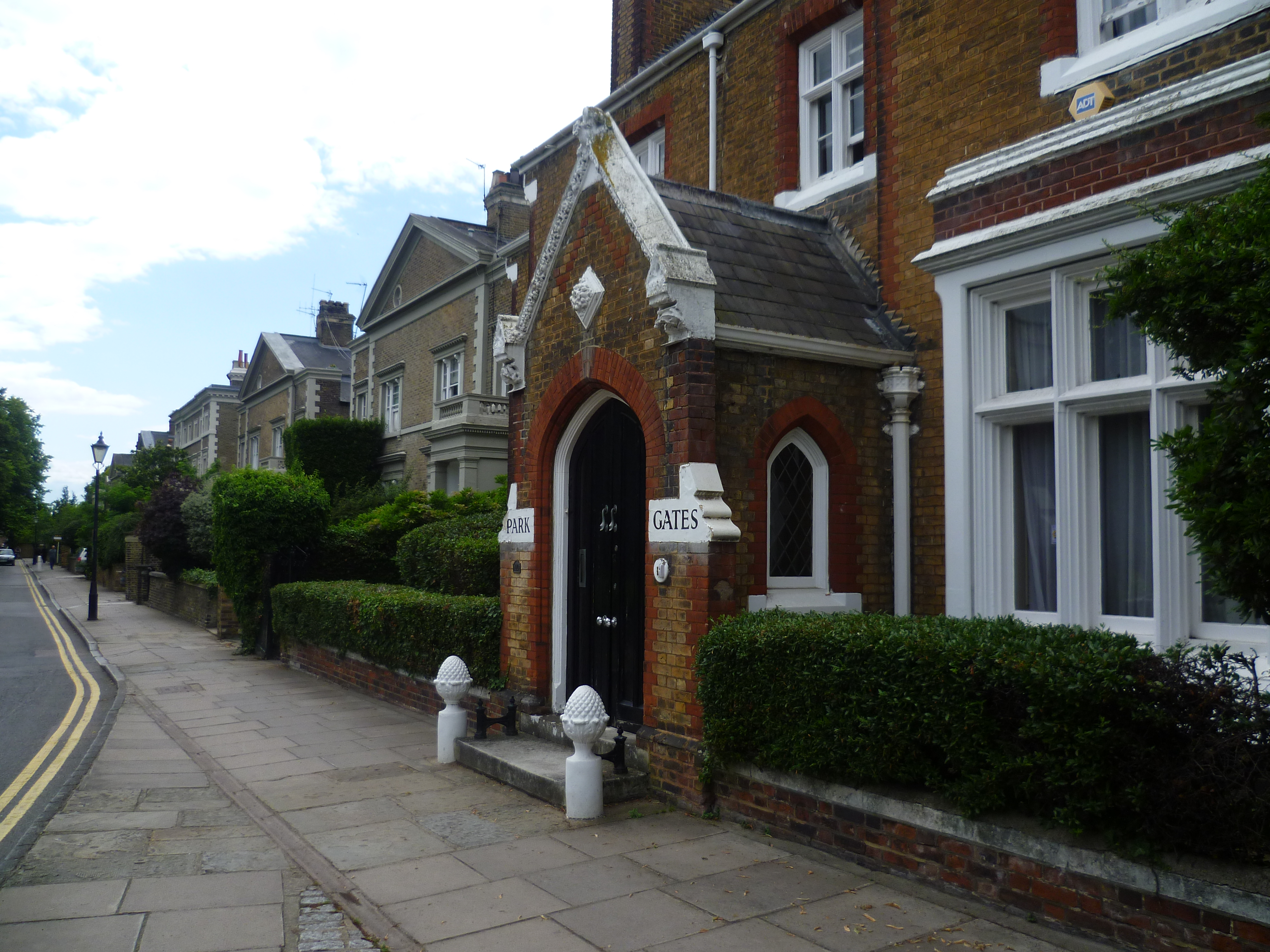
Park Gates House, in Pembroke Villas, is next to the old entrance to Old Deer Park.

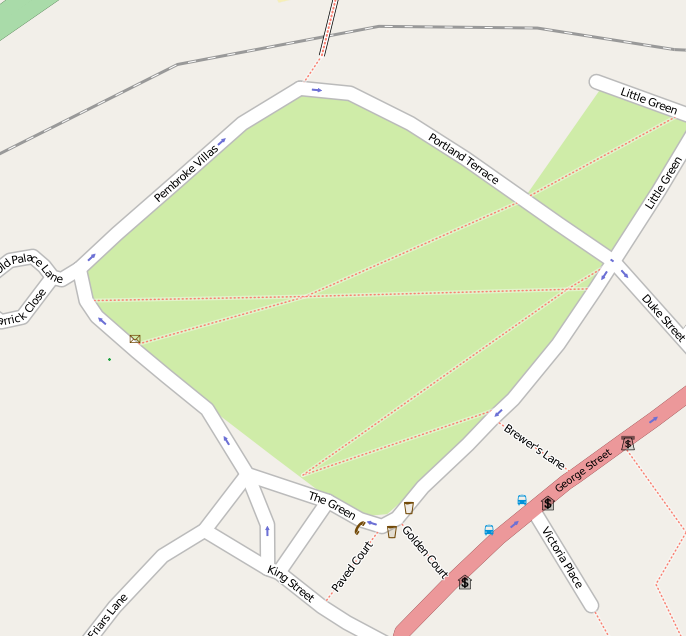
Street map of Richmond Green

== See also ==
- Richmond Green cricket ground
- Richmond Green United Reformed Church
- Richmond Palace
- Richmond Theatre (London)
