= St Mary's University, Twickenham =

Catholic university in Twickenham, London, England

- Coat of arms of the university
- Motto: Latin: Monstra te Esse Matrem
- Motto in English: Show Thyself to be a Mother
- Type: Public university
- Established: 1850 (as St Mary's College); 2014 (gained university status)
- Religious affiliation: Roman Catholic
- Academic affiliations: Cathedrals Group; GuildHE; ACCU; IFCU
- Endowment: £104 million (2022)
- Budget: £53.7 million (2021-22)
- Chancellor: Vincent Cardinal Nichols
- Vice-Chancellor: Anthony McClaran
- Students: 5,965 (2024/25)
- Undergraduates: 3,905 (2024/25)
- Postgraduates: 2,055 (2024/25)
- Location: Strawberry Hill, Twickenham, London, United Kingdom; 51.4376°N 0.335°W
- Campus: Suburban
- Affiliated universities: University of Surrey; University of London
- Colours: Blue and White
- Website: stmarys.ac.uk

St Mary's University is a public university in Strawberry Hill, Twickenham, in the London Borough of Richmond upon Thames. Established in 1850, it is the oldest Catholic university in the United Kingdom. The university received full university status in 2014 and has since expanded its academic portfolio, particularly in teacher education, sport science, health, and the humanities. St Mary's is a campus university with a student population of around 5,000, known for its Catholic heritage and partnerships across London's education and health sectors.

== History ==
Originally founded in 1850 as a college for training Catholic schoolmasters, St. Mary's became a constituent college of the University of London Institute of Education in 1949. This affiliation ended in 1976, and the university's degree courses were then validated by the University of Surrey. Formerly called St Mary's University College, the university was granted full title by the Privy Council on 23 January 2014. Since July 2019, the university has hosted the Mater Ecclesiae College, whose Ecclesiastical faculties (enshrined since 2013 in the "Bellarmine Institute") were added after the closure of Heythrop College, University of London.

=== Strawberry Hill House and the Chapel in the Wood ===
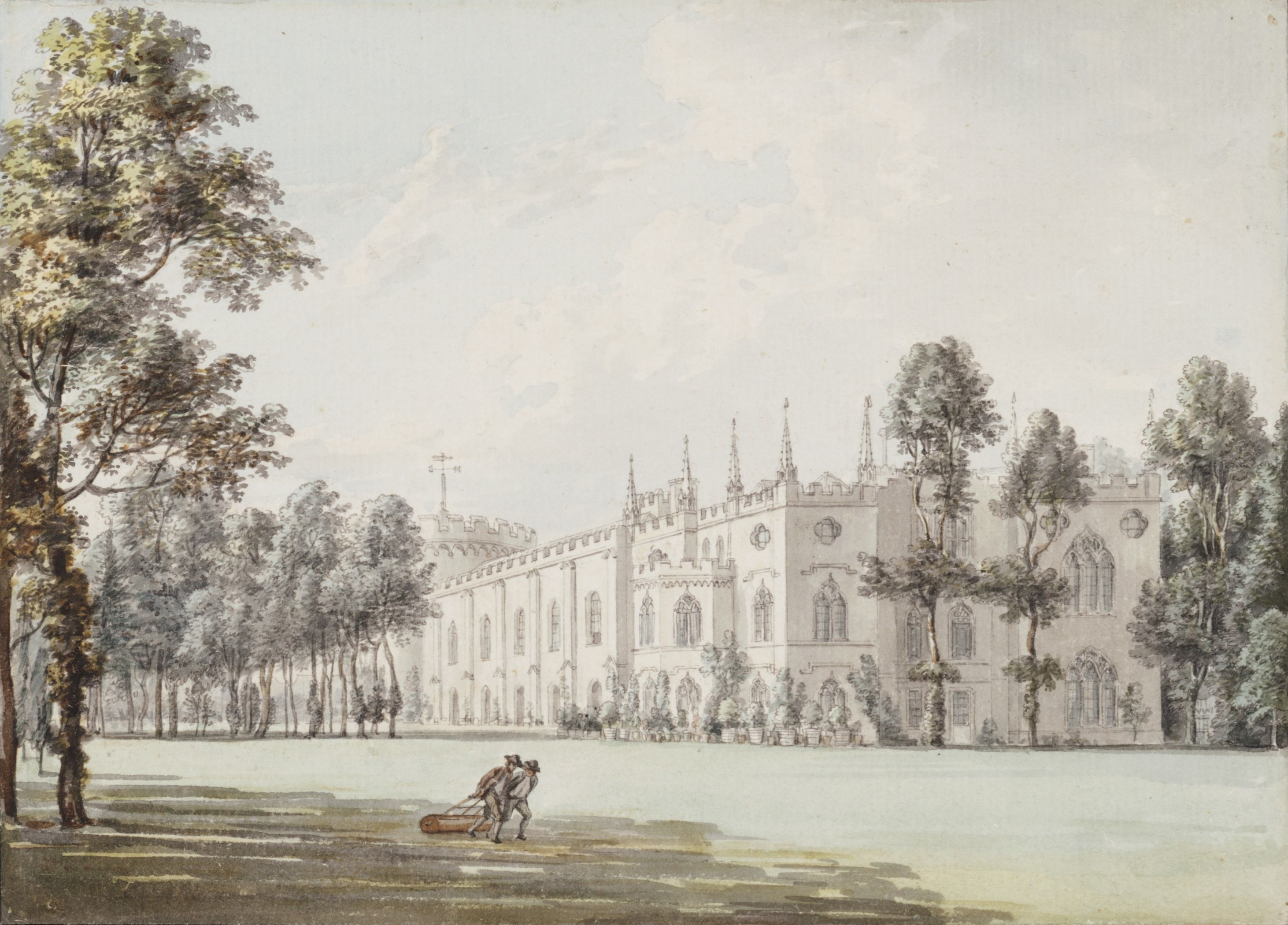
Strawberry Hill House and gardens. 18th-century watercolour by Paul Sandby

The university is built on land previously attached to Strawberry Hill House, which was originally a small cottage on three acres of land by the River Thames. Horace Walpole, son of politician Robert Walpole, rented the cottage in 1747 and subsequently bought it. He reconstructed the house and added to the land, which now amounts to approximately 35 acres (140,000 m^{2}).

Walpole did not follow the conventional 18th-century fashion of classical building, but sought his inspiration from medieval styles, creating a notable early example of neo-Gothic architecture. Some of his contemporaries imitated his design; this house and the idea it embodied take their place in the history of architecture as "Strawberry Hill Gothic".

By the end of the 20th century, Strawberry Hill House had fallen into a state of disrepair, with the cost of reversing its condition too substantial for the college to meet. The Grade One listed building had been registered as a building at risk by English Heritage (now Historic England) in 1996, and in August 2002, the Strawberry Hill Trust was formed with a mission to restore the building and open it to the wider public. After the building was included in the 2004 World Monuments Fund Watch list of the world's 100 Most Endangered Sites and featured on the BBC Two programme Restoration, the Heritage Lottery Fund awarded the Strawberry Hill Trust a £4.6 million grant in 2005. £370,000 in development funding and a £1.4M investment from St Mary's were also received, but finances still fell short of the projected £8.2M cost of restoration. The shortfall was finally met in 2007, and in July of that year, the lease was transferred from the Catholic Education Service to the Trust. Restoration began in 2008, and the house was opened to the public in September 2010 following the completion of the first phase of the £9M project.

Near the porter's lodge is what Bridget Cherry and Sir Nikolaus Pevsner describe as an "incongruous Walpole survival without its protective vegetation". The Grade I listed Chapel in the Wood is a garden building designed in 1772 by John Chute and was completed in 1774 by Thomas Gayfere the Elder. It was restored in 1954 as a chapel to include a shrine of the Virgin Mary, with new murals and stained glass by Harry Clarke. The stained glass that Walpole housed is now at its original home at Bexhill Church, Sussex.

=== Foundation ===
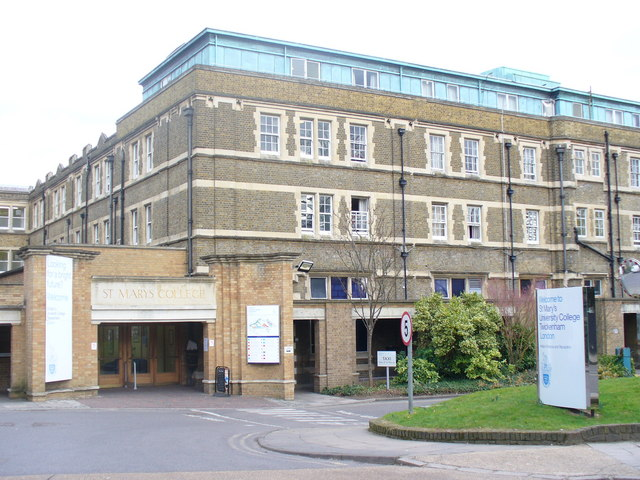
Entrance to the main campus on Waldegrave Road

St Mary's was founded in 1850 on the initiative of Cardinal Wiseman. The Catholic Poor School Committee, which was concerned with providing primary education to children of poor Catholic people throughout the United Kingdom, purchased a former girls' school at Brook Green House, Hammersmith, and adapted it for use as a college with accommodation for 40 adult male students. A legal trust created on 16 July 1851 in connection with this property and its use as a training college for Catholic schoolmasters was confirmed in perpetuity.

The college was established on similar lines to that of the Brothers of Christian Instruction (les Frères d'Instruction Chrétienne) at Ploermel, Brittany, where English students were sent between 1848 and 1851. A French brother, Brother Melanie, was initially placed in charge of St Mary's College, until the appointment of an English principal, Rev. John Melville Glennie, in 1851.

The college opened with six adult male students who had begun their training at the novitiate of the Brothers of Christian Instruction. It was expected that students would join the teaching religious order, however in 1854, in response to a shortage of suitably qualified candidates, the decision was taken to admit lay students to the college. In 1855, additional accommodation was provided for 50 lay students, and by 1860 only lay students were attending the college.

The Catholic Church tried to found in 1873 a British Catholic University (Catholic University College, Kensington) but this Institution failed and closed in 1882.

With the appointment of the fourth principal, Father William Byrne CM in 1899, the association of the college with the Congregation of the Mission (usually known as the Vincentians) commenced. This inaugurated a period of change and augmentation, seen in the increase in staff and student numbers, the introduction of the office of Dean, and the extension of the college premises made possible by funding from the Catholic Education Council. At the same time the college was concerned with adjusting to the requirements of the Education Acts of 1902–03 and their effect on the development of elementary education.

In 1898 Inter-College Sports were introduced between Borough Road, St Mark's, St John's, Westminster and St Mary's Colleges. The college magazine, The Simmarian, began a new series in 1903–04. Originally in manuscript form, it became a printed paper in 1905 and is still published today.

=== Early 20th century ===
By 1924 there were 129 resident students at the college. Recognising the limitations of facilities at Hammersmith, the Principal the Very Rev J J Doyle, CM, along with Sir John Gilbert and Sir Francis Anderton, negotiated the sale of the Hammersmith site to the neighbouring J. Lyons and Co. in 1922, and in 1923 the purchase of the Walpole-Waldegrave property at Strawberry Hill, Twickenham, from Lord Michelham.

The college moved to its Strawberry Hill site in 1925 despite the extensive new buildings, designed by S. Pugin-Powell, being at that point incomplete. It was not until June 1927 that the latter were officially opened. The new site provided accommodation for 150 students, with 190 students altogether.

The majority of students were from England and Wales and entered according to Board of Education regulations. There were also a number of private students from 1925 onwards, including approximately 40 coming annually from Northern Ireland, as well as students from Malta, and brothers from England and Wales. Private students lived in accommodation separate from the college.

Prior to 1928 the Certificate of Education course and examinations were jointly controlled by the Board of Education and individual training colleges. With the introduction of a new scheme for London teacher training colleges, the Board of Education retained its inspectorship functions, but delegated its authority over the courses and examination to the University of London. Under this scheme, the four resident male teacher training colleges in London (St Mary's, Strawberry Hill; Borough Road, St. Mark's and St. John's; and Westminster) were formed into a group under the supervision of University College London (UCL).

This group was jointly responsible with UCL for drawing up the syllabuses of the courses taught at the colleges, while the final examinations were designed to qualify students for the Certificate of Education awarded by the University of London. To direct the scheme, the Training College Delagacy was established, composed of representatives of the university, the teacher training colleges, religious denominations and local authorities. Meanwhile, two representatives of the University of London joined the governing board of St Mary's.

In 1930, in addition to the Certificate of Education course and examination, degree courses were provided at St Mary's University College leading to a University of London degree for successful candidates. At the same time a one-year colonial course was established at the college to train Priests and Brothers destined to join overseas missions. In 1935, responsibility for this course was transferred to the Jesuits.

=== After World War II ===
The college became a constituent college of the University of London Institute of Education, inaugurated on 19 December 1949, and the incorporation of the college into the institute was formally approved by the Senate of the university in April 1950, the college's centenary year.

In response to the increasing demand for teachers, it was agreed in 1959 to expand the college to 500 places. By 1966, there were 1,000 students. 1966 also saw the admission of the first full-time women students to the college. Other developments include the introduction in 1968 of an extra year's study for the conversion of the Teacher's Certificate to a Bachelor of Education degree, and in 1975, the first students pursuing the University of London Bachelor of Arts, Bachelor of Humanities and Bachelor of Science.

St Mary's association with the University of London came to an end in 1979. St Mary's degree courses were then validated by the University of Surrey in Guildford. Representatives from St Mary's College attended meetings of the University of Surrey Delegacy which was set up in 1980. In 1986 the first students of the college graduated with degrees from the University of Surrey.

With the retirement of Fr. Desmond Beirne as Principal in 1992, the college's educational links with the Vincentians came to an end, although the post of chaplain was held by a Vincentian (Rev Perry Gildea CM) until 1996 and one teaching post in the Religious Studies department (Rev Michael Prior CM) until later. Fr Beirne was replaced in 1992 by Arthur Naylor, the college's first lay Principal.

=== Early 21st century ===
In 2006, St Mary's became a University College and was granted the power to award its own degrees by the Privy Council of the United Kingdom. The university maintains study-partnerships with other universities across the globe, including the University of San Francisco, the University of St Thomas (Houston), St Mary's University, Halifax, Australian Catholic University and the Catholic University of America. In 2020, St Mary's entered into historic partnership with The University of Notre Dame Australia.

On 17 September 2010, Pope Benedict XVI visited St Mary's on the second day of his four-day UK state visit, the first papal visit to the country since Pope John Paul II visited in 1982.

On 1 October 2010, Philip Esler became the university's second lay Principal. During 2010 and 2011, existing sports facilities were refurbished and an additional complex was added. The resulting £8.5 million sports centre was opened on 27 October by Lord Sebastian Coe, with Tim Brabants, David Weir, Rebecca Romero and Dave Bedford in attendance; the latter two, both St Mary's alumni, were inducted into the St Mary's Hall of Fame for Sports.

The University College was granted full university title (status) by the Privy Council on 23 January 2014, becoming St Mary's University.

In July 2019 the ecclesiastical Faculties of Philosophy and Theology of Allen Hall Seminary were transferred to St Mary's University and renamed Mater Ecclesiae College after their previous host institution, Heythrop College, University of London closed down.

== Sporting achievements ==
=== London 2012 ===
Eighteen St Mary's athletes comprising current and former students and members of the University Endurance Performance and Coaching Centre (EPACC) participated in 2012 Summer Olympics in athletics (Andrew Osagie and Mo Farah), rowing (Moe Sbihi) and hockey. David Weir won quadruple gold in the 800m, 1500m, 5000m and Marathon at the 2012 Summer Paralympics.

St Mary's was selected as a pre-Games training camp for the 2012 Summer Olympics by the South African Sports Confederation and Olympic Committee and the Olympic Council of Ireland. Endurance squads from the Chinese and Japanese Olympic teams also elected to be based at St Mary's pre-Games training camp. Athletes and officials from those four countries were ultimately joined by others from another six countries: the US, Australia, New Zealand, Kenya, Denmark and Mozambique.

=== Rio 2016 ===
St Mary's saw 22 athletes attend both the 2016 Summer Olympics and Paralympic Games in Rio, topping the record 18 selected for London 2012. The athletes contributed six medals to Team GB, ranking the university as the 25th most successful 'nation' on the medal table with three gold medals, two silver medals and one bronze medal. Medallists at the Games include distance runner and alumnus Mo Farah. Elsewhere, rowers Moe Sbihi and Karen Bennett achieved gold and silver, respectively.

Other medallists included boxer Joshua Buatsi, who achieved Bronze and Simon Amor, who coached the Men's Rugby 7s squad to a silver medal.

=== Tokyo 2020 ===
At the Tokyo 2020 Olympic Games, a number of athletes and alumni associated with St Mary's University, Twickenham were selected to represent their countries in athletics, rowing, cycling, and para-sport events. Endurance Performance Centre athletes such as Revee Walcott-Nolan and Jake Wightman made their Olympic debuts for Great Britain in track events, while alumna Steph Twell competed in the marathon and Anna Møller represented Denmark in the steeplechase. Several rowing alumni including Moe Sbihi MBE, Karen Bennett and Matilda Horn were selected for Team GB's rowing crews at Tokyo, with Sbihi competing in the men's eight. Paralympic competitors such as Corrine Hall and wheelchair racer David Weir also took part in cycling and athletics respectively at the Tokyo Games.

=== Paris 2024 ===
At the Paris 2024 Olympic Games, twelve athletes with a current or previous affiliation to the university were selected to compete across athletics, triathlon, rugby sevens and para-cycling. Alumna Beth Potter won two bronze medals for Great Britain in the women's triathlon and mixed relay events. Alumnus Aaron Grandidier won a gold medal with the French men's rugby sevens team. Endurance Performance Centre alumnus Emile Cairess finished fourth in the men's marathon, the highest placing by a British male marathon runner at the Olympic Games since 2004.

=== 2025 Women's Rugby World Cup ===
In women's rugby union, four alumnae — Ellie Kildunne, Jess Breach, Abi Burton and Rosie Galligan — were members of the England national team that won the 2025 Women's Rugby World Cup, defeating Canada in the final at Twickenham Stadium. During the same tournament, current student Aoife Wafer represented Ireland and reached the quarter-final stage of the competition.

== Partnerships ==
St Mary's operates a number of partnerships with higher education providers, charities, sporting organisations, businesses, and religious organisations. Amongst these are The Royal Ballet, London Irish RFC, Roman Catholic Archdiocese of St Andrews and Edinburgh, Chelsea FC Foundation, University of Notre Dame, Union Theological College, University of Notre Dame Australia, Institut Catholique de Paris, amongst many others.

== Academic profile ==
Rankings
National rankings
- Complete (2027): 72
- Guardian (2027): 114
- Times / Sunday Times (2027): 113

St Mary's University, Twickenham is made of up two Academic Faculties and six schools:

- Faculty of Sport, Technology and Health Sciences (FSTHS)
- Faculty of Arts, Business, Law, Education and Theology (FABLET)
- School of Allied Health and Life Sciences
- School of Sport, Exercise and Applied Science
- School of Business and Law
- School of Education
- School of Arts and Theology
- School of Medicine

The university has been rated (Ofsted outstanding) for its teacher training programme since 2011.

Staff are engaged in both national and international research, which was described as "world-leading in terms of originality, significance and rigour" in the most recent Research Excellence Framework (REF). St Mary's has 13 research centres, including the Bakhita Centre for Research on Slavery, Exploitation and Abuse, established in 2015 with Sir Mo Farah as a patron, and the Benedict XVI Centre for Religion and Society which opened on the 5 May 2016.

The university also runs short courses and CPD sessions on weekends and during the evenings, including sport, health, nutrition and exercise. These are run by their Centre for Short Courses & CPD.

The university is a member of Advance HE's Athena Swan Charter.

== Chapel ==
The university's chapel, designed by Sir Albert Richardson, was built in 1962–63. Mass is held every Sunday morning and (during term time) on Sunday evening. During term times there is also a lunchtime Mass on weekdays.

== Campus facilities ==
=== Students' Union ===
The Students' Union (SU) was first housed in the original chapel and had a bar where the Baptismal font used to be. The SU was then moved to another building and the old chapel was converted into a lecture hall. In 2024 a purpose-built venue was created, named The 1850 after the University's founding year, to house the SU bar, including additional rooms for pool, cinema-style film viewings and events.

The building has a bar with screens for viewing sporting events. There are a number of regular events, such as discos and quiz nights.

=== Refectory and Shannon Suite ===
In 2008 the refectory underwent a £4 million investment to create a larger seating area with new kitchen facilities and a conference centre. It officially opened on 17 April 2008. Named after Very Rev Gerald Shannon CM (Principal of St Mary's 1941–1948), the Shannon Conference Suite is above the refectory and consists of three conference rooms with AV provision.

=== Library ===
The university library is at the centre of the Strawberry Hill campus, providing study and IT facilities which are open 24/7 for current students and staff, as well as housing print resources for most disciplines active within the university. The university's Doctoral College and associated facilities for postgraduate research students are also based in the library. St Mary's Library has a print book collection of approximately 79,000 volumes. In addition it provides access to around 570,000 e-books and 86,000 e-journals for staff and students.

=== Sport facilities ===
The universities sports facilities are used by staff, students, professional athletes and teams and community groups. These facilities formed part of the pre-Games training camp used by Olympic athletes and officials from 10 national teams in the run up to London 2012.

In 1999, St Mary's acquired 15.8 acres (64,000 m^{2}) of land near Teddington Lock. This was named Teddington Lock Sports Campus and features a mixture of playing fields, all-weather pitches and parking.

==== Sports centre ====
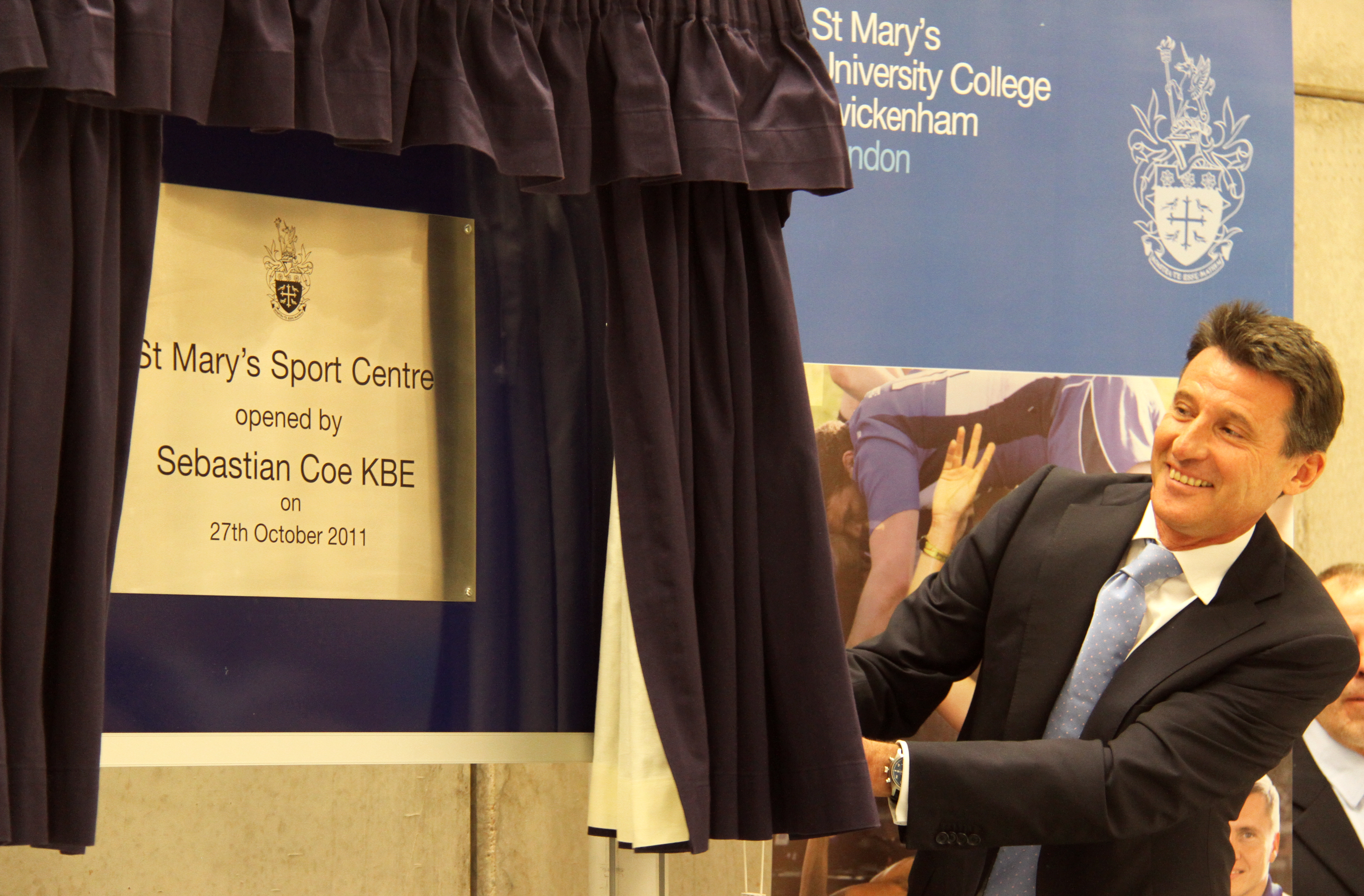
Seb Coe opening St Mary's £8.5 million Sports Centre.

In 2011, Lord Coe opened St Mary's new sports centre. A new building was constructed to create a single centre linking new facilities to the existing tennis hall and original 1960s sports block, which underwent refurbishment in 2010.

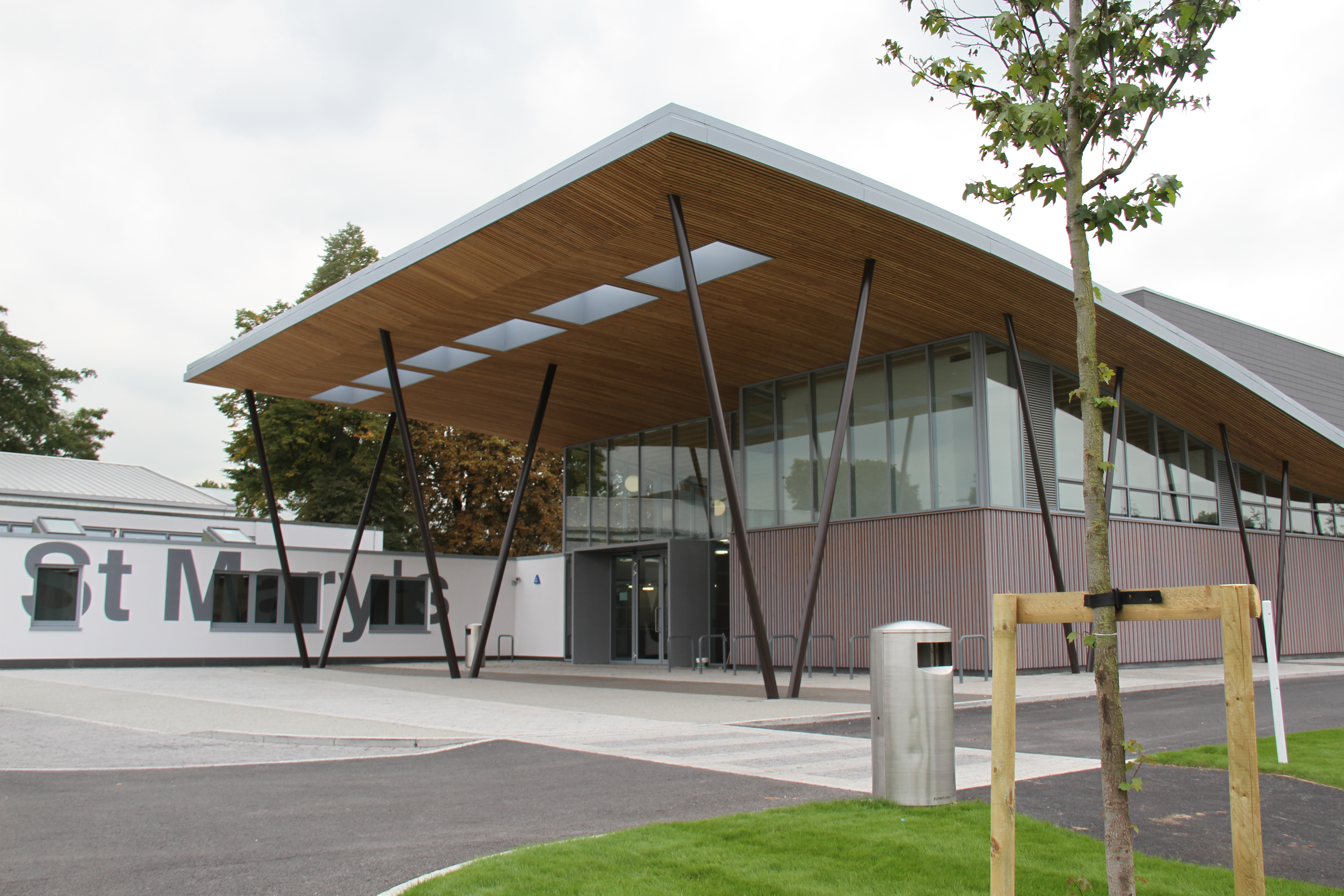
St Mary's Sports Village.

The centre includes a fitness suite and a sports hall. The sports hall caters for a range of sports, from 5-a-side football to sport specific training and competitions.

==== Athletics track ====
In 2017, athletes from SMRAC (St Mary's Richmond Athletics Club) who use the track and students attended the official opening of the renamed Sir Mo Farah track. The six-lane, 400 m synthetic running track is floodlit and can be used all year round. It was opened in 2005 and underwent resurfacing in 2010. In addition to being used by students, it is used by local schools, St Mary's Richmond Athletic Club and world class athletes connected to the St Mary's Endurance Performance and Coaching Centre (EPACC) including Mo Farah, Joanne Pavey, Andrew Baddeley, Andrew Osagie and Stephanie Twell. In addition, the track has been used by Usain Bolt, the Kenyan National Long Distance team and the Chinese Marathon squad.

== Accommodation ==
St Mary's University has halls of residence, most of which are on the main campus, or within walking distance.

- Lady Frances Court – Constructed in 2005 the De Marillac Hall is at the far end of the university's running track, adjacent to Graham, Wiseman and Doyle Halls. The three-storey building has 180 bedrooms.
- Graham, Wiseman & Doyle – Named after Canon Thomas Graham (Principal of St Mary's, 1869–1899), Cardinal Wiseman and the James Doyle (Principal of St Mary's, 1921–1930), these conjoining halls are at the far end of the sports track. The total number of rooms in Graham is 34, Doyle has 34 and Wiseman has 47.
- Clive Halls – accommodating a maximum of 62 students.
- Cronin – Named after Kevin Cronin (Principal of St Mary's, 1948–1969), these halls were built in 1993. They have 69 en-suite single study bedrooms with shared utility kitchens.
- Cashin – Named after Thomas Cashin (Principal of St Mary's, 1969–1976), this building has 22 bedrooms in total.
- Old House – in the main building adjacent to the administration area, Old House has 114 single study bedrooms.
- Waldegrave Park Houses – These are Victorian houses at the south edge of the campus. There are nine separate houses, offering accommodation of either single study bedrooms or shared study bedrooms. They all have shared bathroom facilities and utility kitchens, the total number of bedrooms in each hostel ranging from 5 to 12.

== Notable alumni ==
- Hugh Allan, Roman Catholic prelate
- Jason Arday, Academic
- Clara Amfo, Radio and television presenter
- Nihal Arthanayake, Radio and television presenter
- Anna Maria Ashe, newsreader and television presenter
- Robert Beck, actor
- Dave Bedford, athlete
- Eamon Boland, actor
- Beth Potter, Olympic Bronze medallist
- Jess Breach, 2025 Rugby World Cup winner
- Abi Burton, 2025 Rugby World Cup winner
- Joshua Buatsi, professional boxer and Olympic medalist
- Chris Chibnall, English playwright, television writer and producer
- Paul Clement, football manager
- Philip Don, former football referee
- Francis Ebejer, dramatist and novelist
- Mo Farah, four-time Olympic champion athlete
- Rosie Galligan, 2025 Rugby World Cup winner
- Gordon Gray, Roman Catholic Archbishop of St. Andrews and Edinburgh
- Aaron Grandidier, Olympic Gold medallist
- Tom Grennan, musician
- Corrine Hall, Gold medal cyclist
- Toby Gold, Paralympic silver medallist
- Stephen Henry, theatre director and producer
- Philip Hoare, writer
- Jonathan Holloway, theatre director and playwright
- Roger Jupp, Anglican Bishop of Popondetta
- John Junkin, actor
- Ellie Kildunne, 2025 Rugby World Cup winner
- Lara Lewington, television presenter, journalist and former weather presenter
- Will Lovell, professional rugby league footballer
- Eamonn McCrystal, Northern Irish pop tenor and TV-radio host
- Tim Murtagh, cricketer
- Michael Melia, actor
- Aled Miles, businessman
- Margaret Moran, Labour Party politician
- Tom O'Connor, actor and comedian
- Andrew Osagie, Olympic 800 metres athlete
- Gordon Pirie, athlete
- Pete Postlethwaite, actor
- Les Reed, football coach
- Rebecca Romero, Olympic gold medallist
- Shelley Rudman, Olympic Skeleton medallist
- Nicola Sanders, Olympic sprinter and hurdler
- Moe Sbihi, Olympic gold and bronze medallist rower
- Jemma Simpson, athlete
- Georgia Steel, television personality and actress
- Richard Thorpe, rugby union player
- James Tindall, Olympic field hockey player
- Adelle Tracey, Elite middle-distance runner
- Stephanie Twell, middle distance runner
- Christian Wade, rugby union player and former American football player
- Matthew Wells, Olympic rower
- Joe Wicks, fitness coach, television presenter and author

== Notable academics ==
- Alexandra Atack (Biomechanist)
- Cherie Blair (Visiting professor in law)
- Sir Vince Cable (Visiting professor)
- Monsignor Thomas Capel (Vice-Principal, 1854–58)
- Seán Ó Faoláin (Lecturer, 1929–33) – Irish short story writer who wrote his first two books while working at the college.
- Reginald C. Fuller (Lecturer, 1968–1972) – later honorary Canon of Westminster Cathedral
- Ruth Kelly (Pro Vice-Chancellor)
- Mary McAleese (Distinguished Professor in Irish Studies)
- Mick Woods (Sports Lecturer/Athletics Coach)
- Dominic Bruce (Member of the Board of Governors of St Mary's College)

== See also ==
- Armorial of UK universities
- College of Education
- List of universities in the UK
