= Thomas Gayfere =

English sculptor (1720–1812)

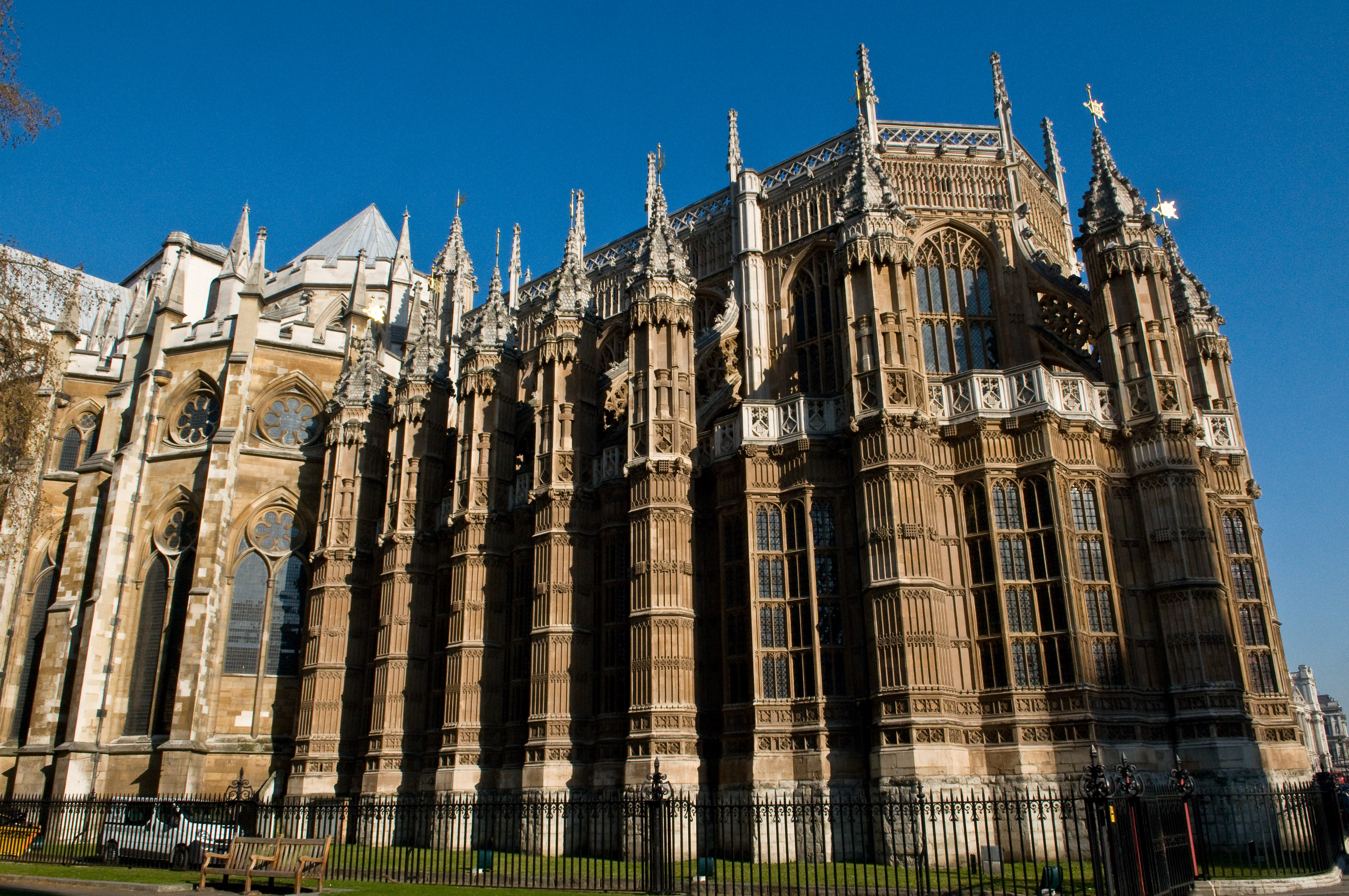
Exterior of Henry VII's Chapel

Thomas Gayfere (1720–1812) was a sculptor and master mason in a line of masons of the same name. His most impressive work is the Henry VII's Chapel in Westminster Abbey. Due to the similarity in names between at least three generations of the family it is not always possible to distinguish the work of one from another. Stylistically all worked in the High Gothic style for most of their work.

== Life ==
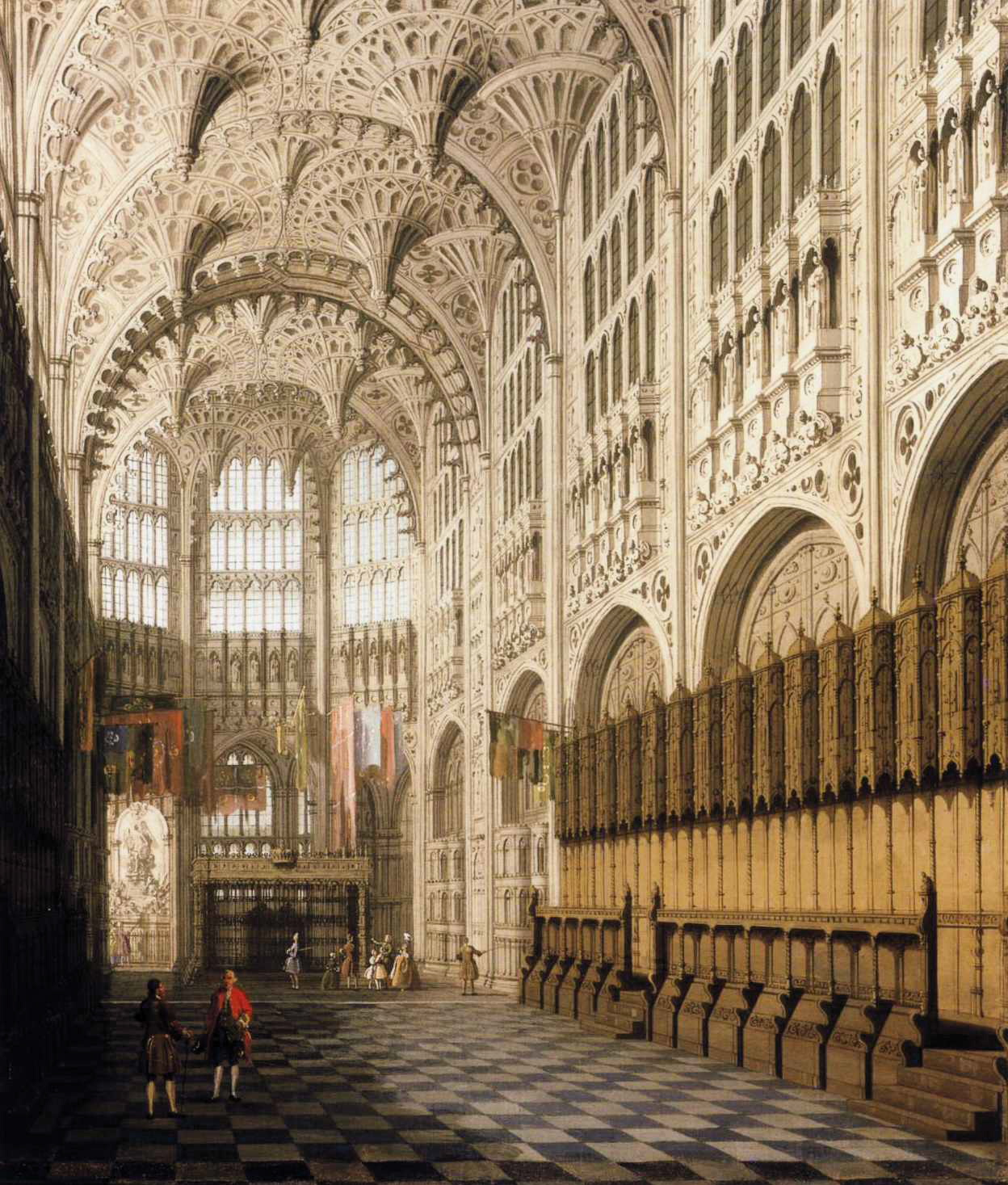
Painting of the interior of Henry VII's Chapel by Canaletto

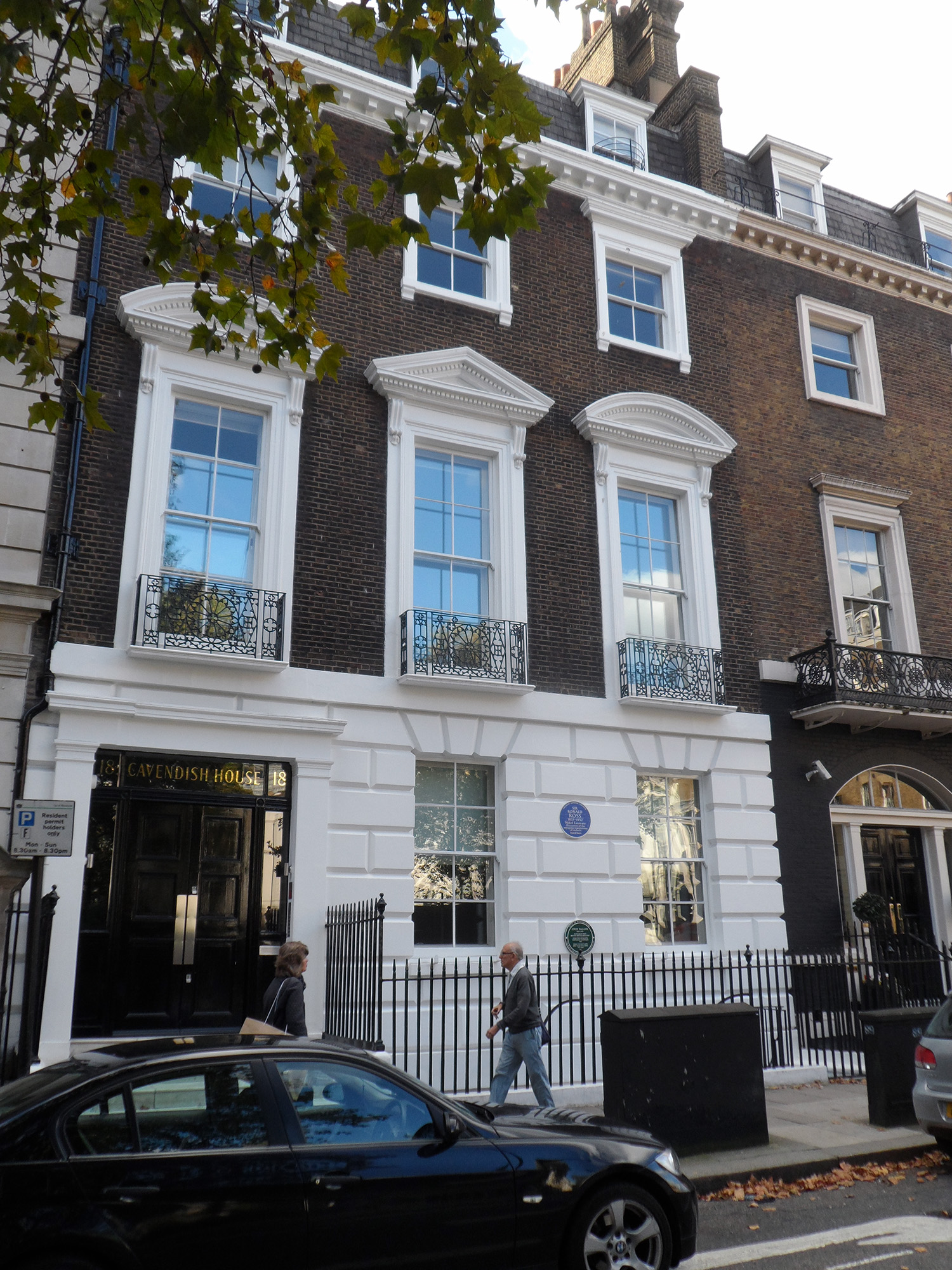
18 Cavendish Square, Marylebone, London

He was born in the Wapping district of London in 1720 the eldest son of Thomas Gayfere, a stonemason, and his wife, Mary Townsend of Burford, who was related to a family of masons in Oxford. His father moved to the Westminster district around 1725 to work with Christopher Cass.

Gayfere was apprenticed to Andrews Jelfe in 1734. In 1762 he obtained the highly prestigious position as Mason to Westminster Abbey. In 1774 he became Master of the Worshipful Company of Masons.

From 1802, he and his son Thomas Gayfere held a joint patent as Mason of Westminster Abbey. They jointly worked on the reconstruction of Henry VII's Chapel under James Wyatt.

He died on 4 April 1812 and is buried in the west cloister of Westminster Abbey on 10 April. He left an estate of around £10,000 (around £500,000 in 2022).

Thomas Gayfere the Younger (1755–1827) completed the work on Henry VII's Chapel in 1823.

== Works ==
- Westminster Bridge (1747 to 1750) possibly with his father
- 18 Cavendish Square for Thomas Bridges (1756)
- Remodelling of Harefield Church (1768/9)
- Chapel in the Wood at Strawberry Hill for Horace Walpole (1773)
- Fireplace in Strawberry Hill House (1774)
- Monument to Mrs Rev William Vincent in Westminster Abbey (1807)
- Henry VII's Chapel (1809 to 1812)
- North side of Westminster Hall (1810 to 1812)

== Works by the Younger ==
- North wing of Somerset House (1809)
- Henry VII's Chapel (1812 to 1823)
- Rose window at Westminster Abbey (1814)
- North side of Westminster Hall (1819 to 1822)

== Recognition ==
Gayfere Street (just south of Westminster Abbey) was named after the family.

=== Gallery ===
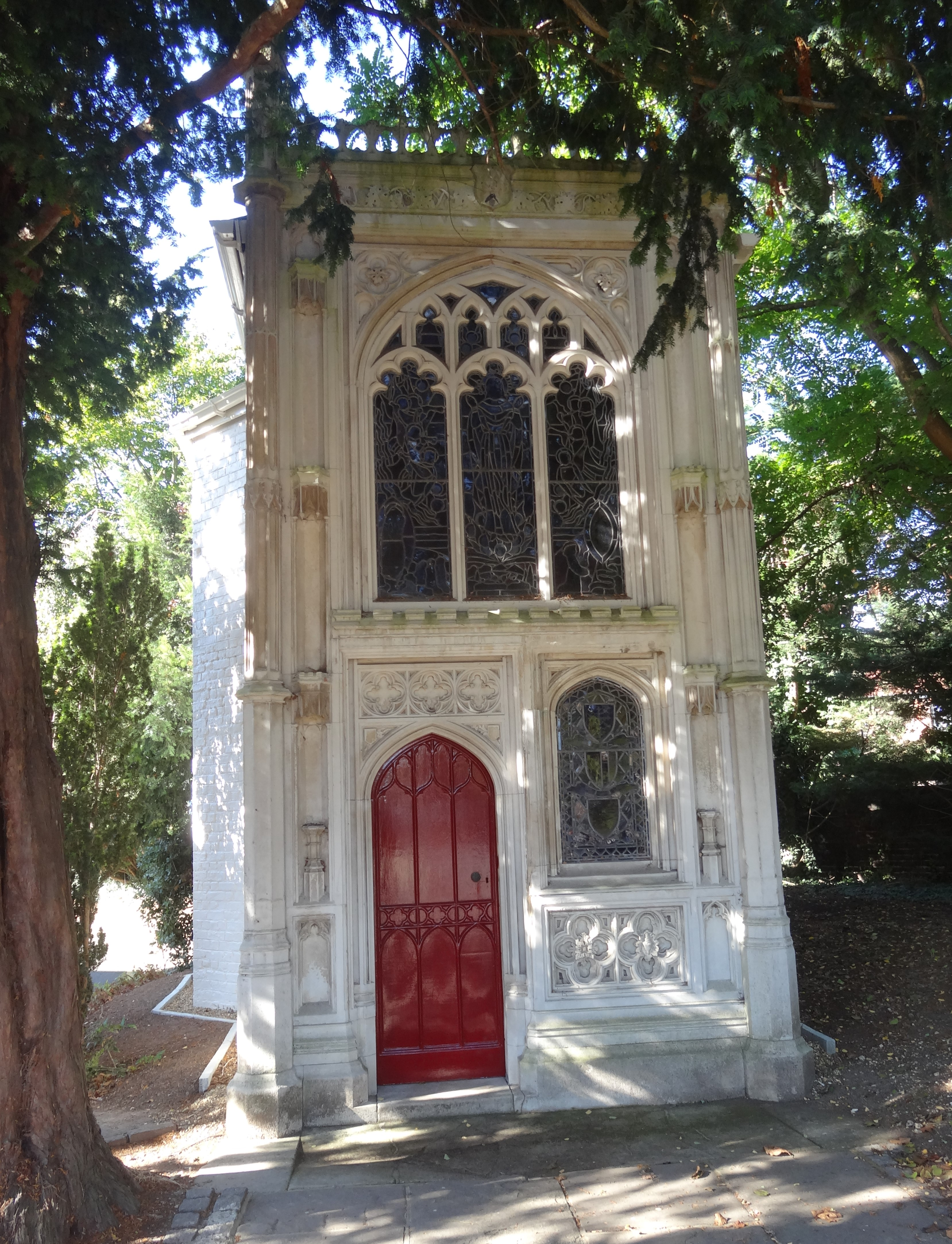
Chapel in the Wood, Strawberry Hill

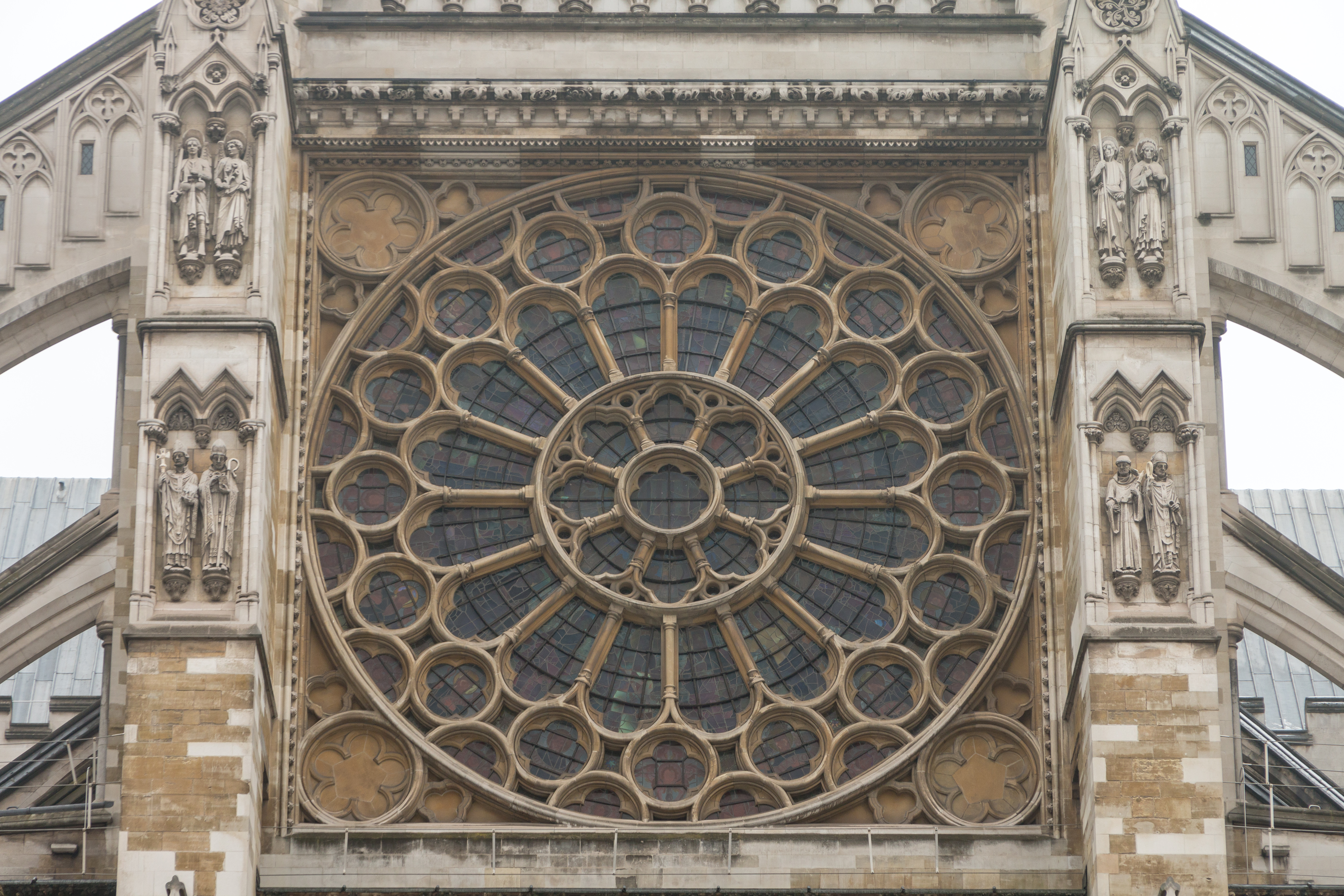
Rose window at Westminster Abbey

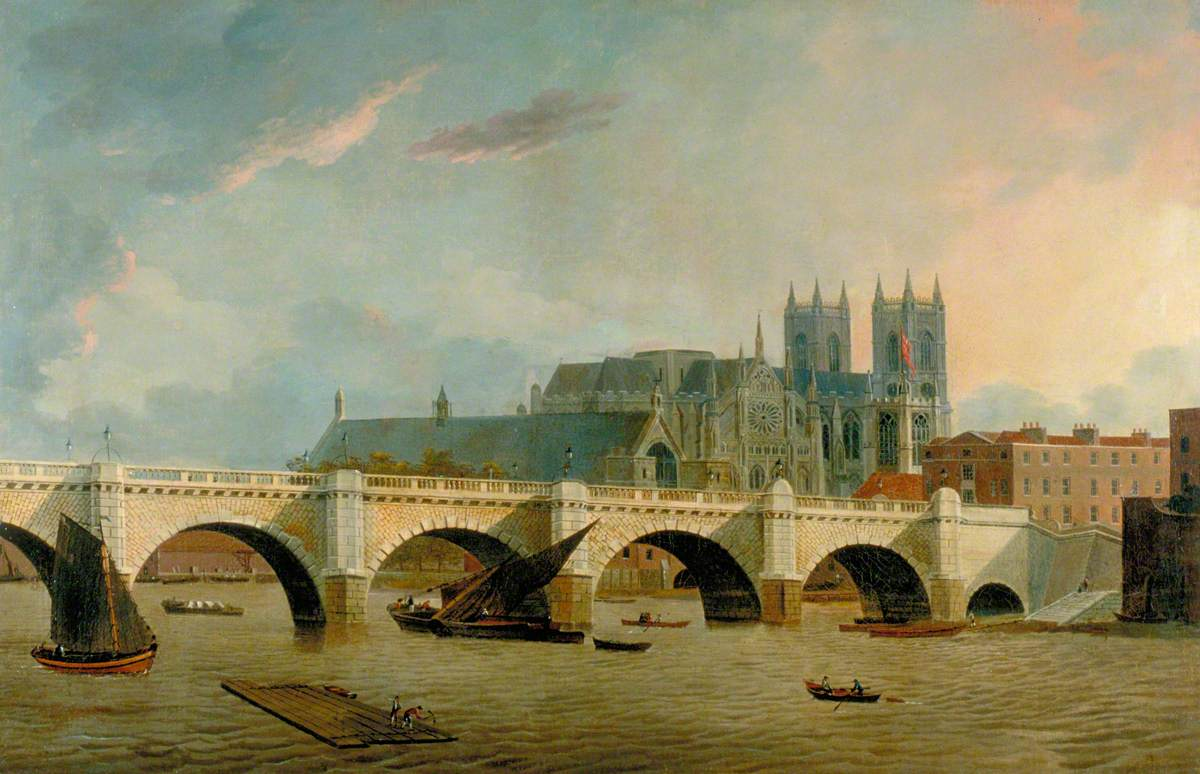
Old Westminster Bridge

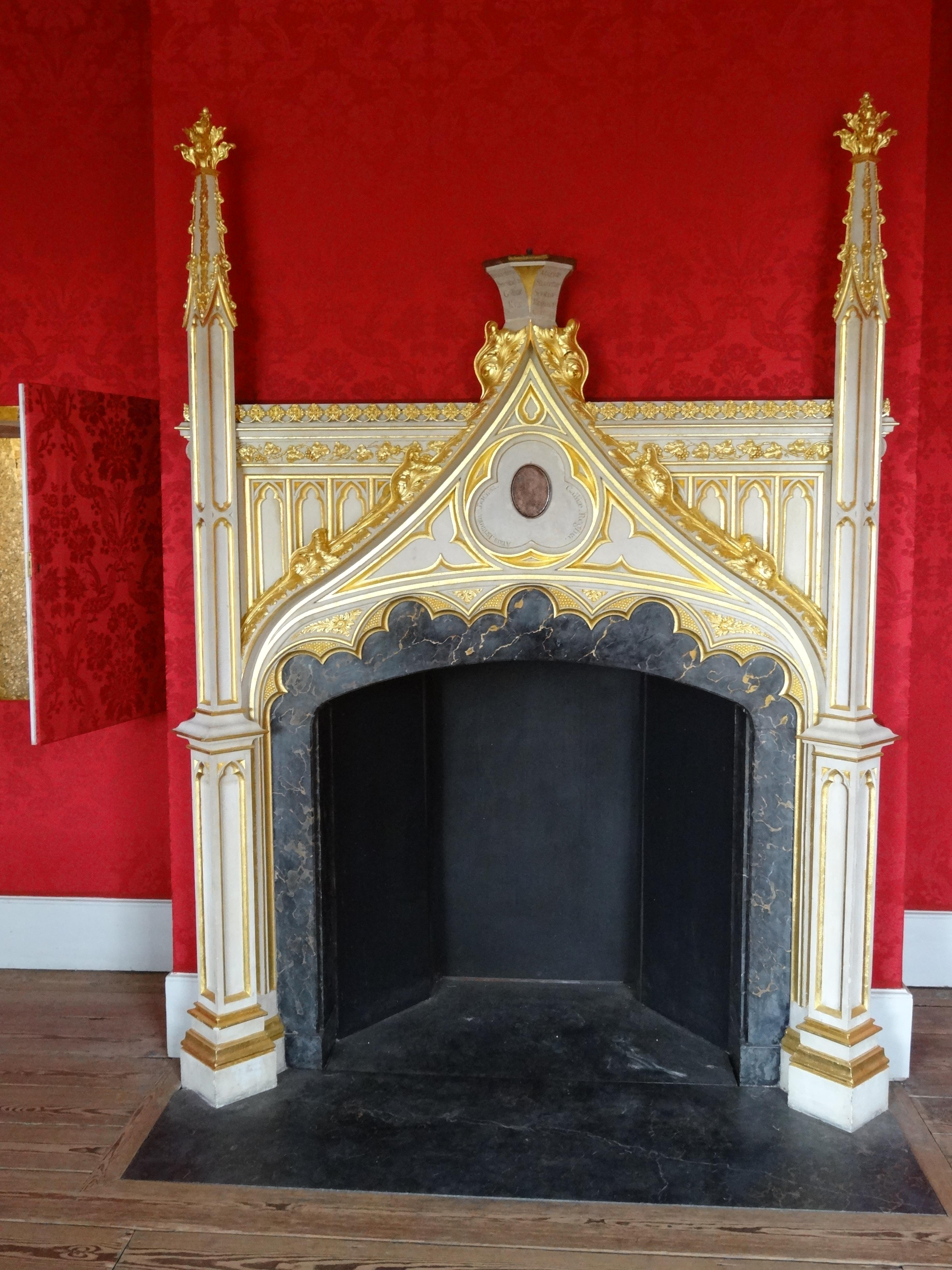
Gayfere's fireplace in Strawberry Hill House
