= Chapel in the Wood, Strawberry Hill =

Coordinates: 51°26′11″N 0°20′11″W

Chapel in the Wood
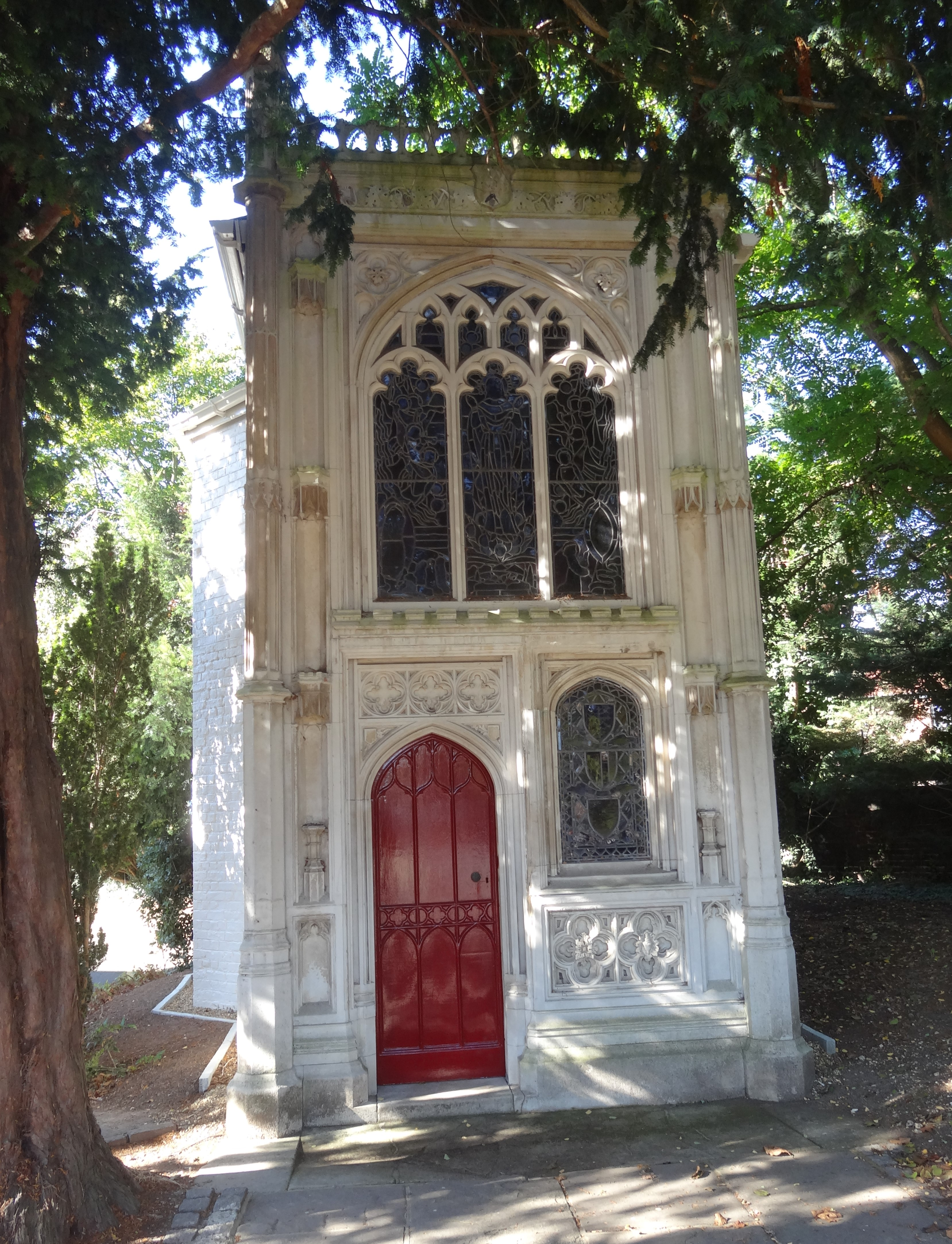
- Front of the chapel
- Interactive map of the Chapel in the Wood area

General information
- Type: Chapel
- Architectural style: early Gothic Revival
- Location: Strawberry Hill, London, England, UK
- Completed: 1774

Technical details
- Floor count: 1

Listed Building – Grade I
- Official name: Chapel in the Wood, Strawberery Hill
- Designated: 25 May 1983
- Reference no.: 1253028

The Chapel in the Wood is a chapel in the grounds of St Mary's University on Waldegrave Road in the Strawberry Hill part of Twickenham, London. The chapel is an example of early Gothic Revival architecture and is a Grade I listed building.

The chapel was built for Horace Walpole in 1772–74 and was in the grounds of his home, Strawberry Hill House. Subsequent building separated the chapel from the house, as the nearest parts of those grounds have been built on with what is now St Mary's University.

The roof is of slate and the front is of Portland stone, with a design inspired by a tomb in Salisbury Cathedral. Sir Nikolaus Pevsner described the blue-and-gold vaulted ceiling as "pretty".

== Restoration and rededication ==
The chapel was restored in 1954 and rededicated to the Virgin Mary with a new statue from Italy and some new stained glass.

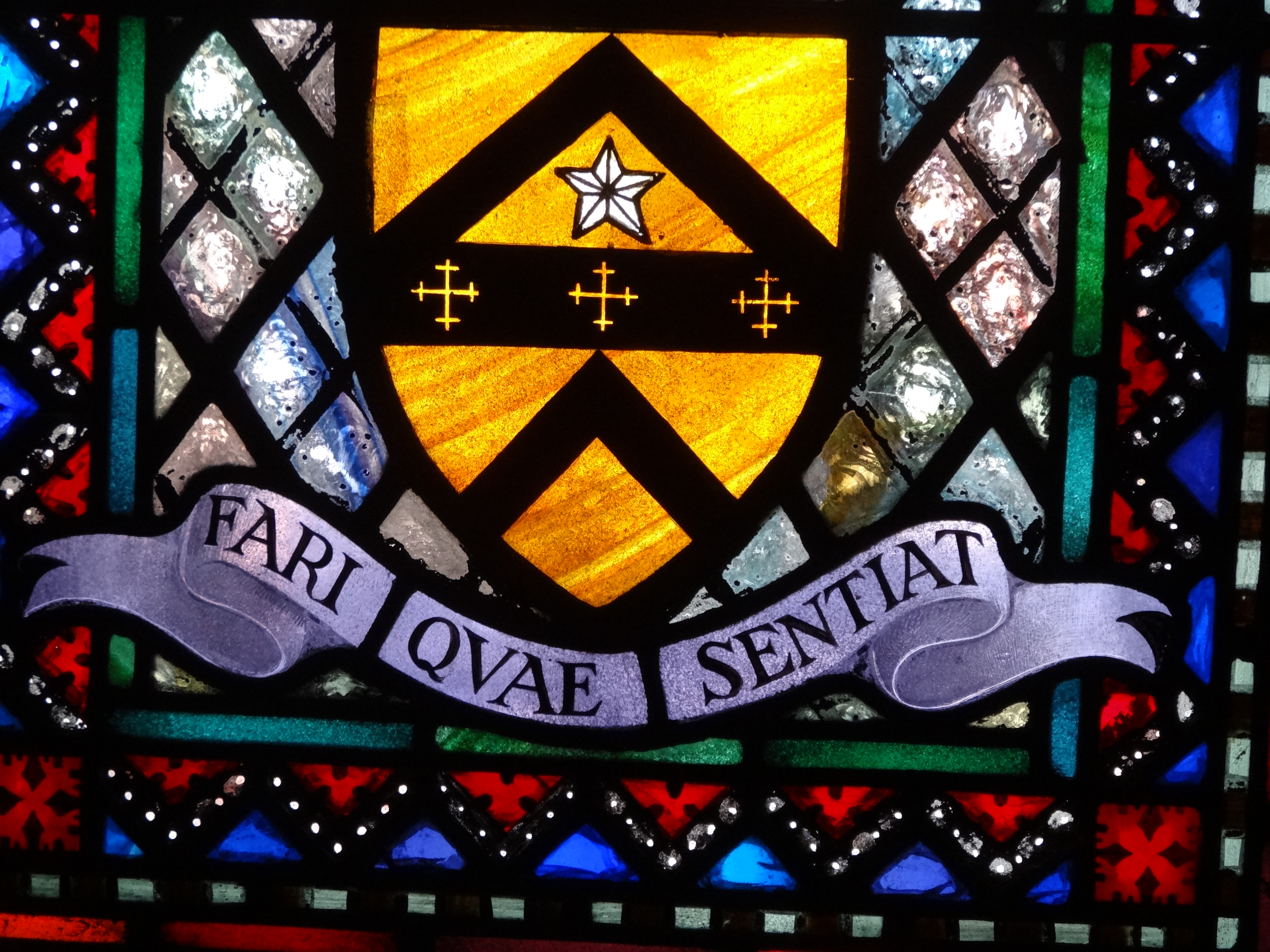
Walpole's motto Fari quae sentiat – "To speak what he feels"
