= Strawberry Hill House =

Historic villa in Twickenham, London

Coordinates: 51.4382°N 0.3348°W

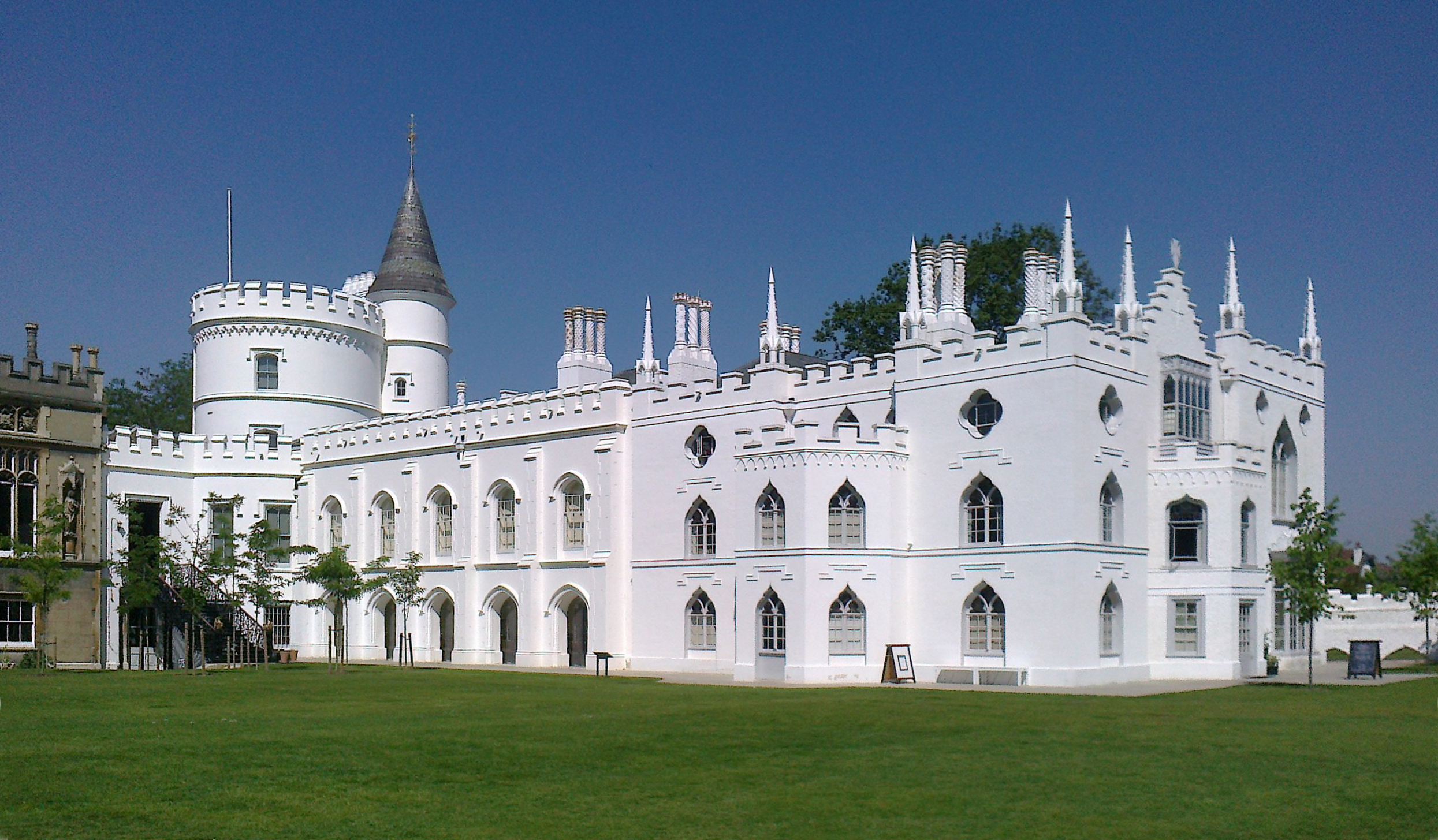
Strawberry Hill House in 2012 after restoration

Strawberry Hill House—often called simply Strawberry Hill—is a Gothic Revival villa in Twickenham, London, built by Horace Walpole from 1749 onward. It is the prototypical example of the "Strawberry Hill Gothic" style of architecture, and it prefigured the nineteenth-century Gothic Revival.

Walpole rebuilt the existing house in stages starting in 1749, 1760, 1772 and 1776. These additions introduced Gothic features such as towers and battlements outside and elaborate decoration inside to create "gloomth" to suit Walpole's collection of antiquarian objects, contrasting with the more cheerful or "riant " (lit. 'laughing') garden. The interior included gilded ceilings and intentionally grand fireplaces—with one by Robert Adam, along with small details like enamelled door handles, carved wooden screens, and ancestral-looking coats of arms; parts of the exterior were designed by James Essex. The garden contained a large seat shaped like a Rococo sea shell, which was recreated during the garden's 2012 restoration, one of the many examples of historic garden conservation in the UK.

Later owners included Anne Seymour Damer and John Waldegrave and his descendants, followed by Hermann de Stern. In 1923 it was bought by the Roman Catholic St Mary's University College.

The Strawberry Hill Gothic architectural style became briefly popular, though its definition is disputed. Examples include Priory Hospital in Roehampton.

== Under Horace Walpole ==
=== Purchase and planning ===
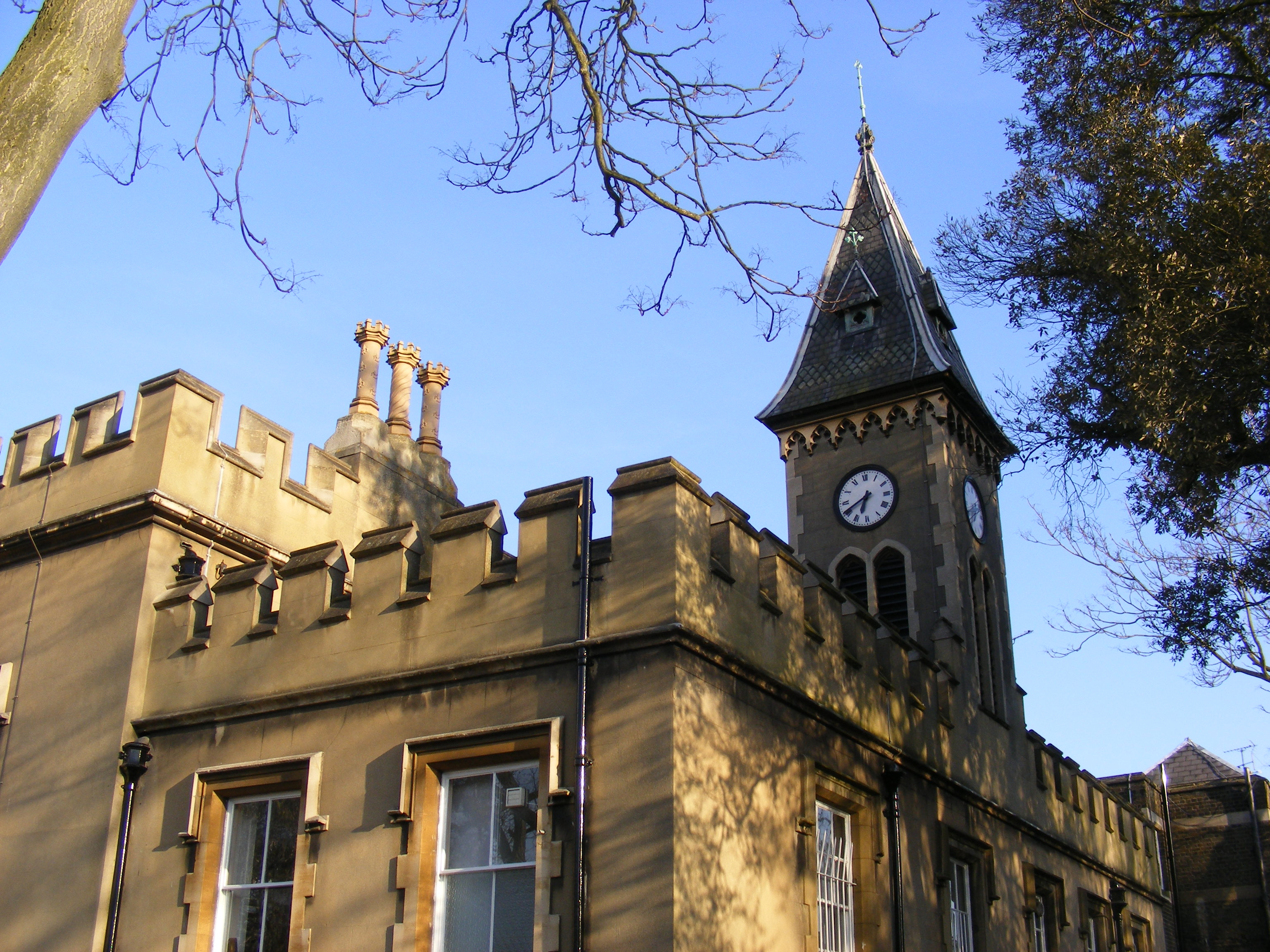
Clock tower of the later 'Waldegrave' extension

In May 1747, Horace Walpole took a lease on a small 17th-century house that was "little more than a cottage", with 5 acres (20,000 m^{2}) of land from a Mrs. Chenevix. The following year he purchased the house, which the original owner, a coachman, had named "Chopped Straw Hall". This was intolerable to Walpole; "his residence ought, he thought, to possess some distinctive appellation; of a very different character ..." Finding an old lease that described his land as "Strawberry Hill Shot", Walpole adopted this new name for his soon to be "elegant villa". Walpole was under familial and political pressure to establish a country seat, especially a family castle, which was a fashionable practice during the period.

In stages, Walpole rebuilt the house to his own specifications, giving it a Gothic style and expanding the property to 46 acres (190,000 m^{2}) over the years. As Rosemary Hill notes, "Strawberry Hill was the first house without any existing medieval fabric to be [re]built from scratch in the Gothic style and the first to be based on actual historic examples, rather than an extrapolation of the Gothic vocabulary first developed by William of Kent. As such it has a claim to be the starting point of the Gothic Revival."

Walpole and two friends, the connoisseur and amateur architect John Chute (1701–1776), and draughtsman and designer Richard Bentley (1708–1782), called themselves a "Committee of Taste" or "Strawberry Committee" formed to modify the architecture of the building. Bentley left the group abruptly after an argument in 1761. Chute had an "eclectic but rather dry style" and was in charge of designing most of the exterior of the house and some of the interior. To Walpole, he was an "oracle of taste". Walpole often disagreed with Bentley on some of his wayward schemes, but admired his talent for illustration.

=== Construction ===
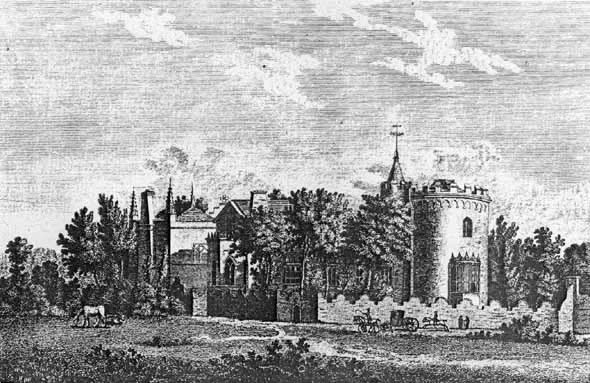
An 18th-century engraving of the villa

The building, inspired by Walpole's Grand Tour journeys to France and Italy, evolved with no fixed plan from the beginning; Walpole added features as and when he saw fit. Externally, these included an assortment of battlements, towers, and turrets. Indeed, Michael Snodin argues, "the most striking external feature of Strawberry Hill was its irregular plan and broken picturesque silhouette".

Inside, Walpole added decorative features, from large structures like gilded ceilings and intentionally grand fireplaces, to small details like enamelled door handles, carved wooden screens, and coats of arms of men that Walpole pretended were his medieval ancestors. The first stage of what Walpole called his "little Gothic castle" began in 1749 and was complete by 1753. A second stage began in 1760, and other modifications such as work on the great north bedchamber were made in 1772. The "Beauclerk Tower" of the third phase was completed to the designs of a professional architect, James Essex, in 1776. The total cost was about £20,720, equivalent to £2,935,884 in 2025.

=== Interior and collection ===
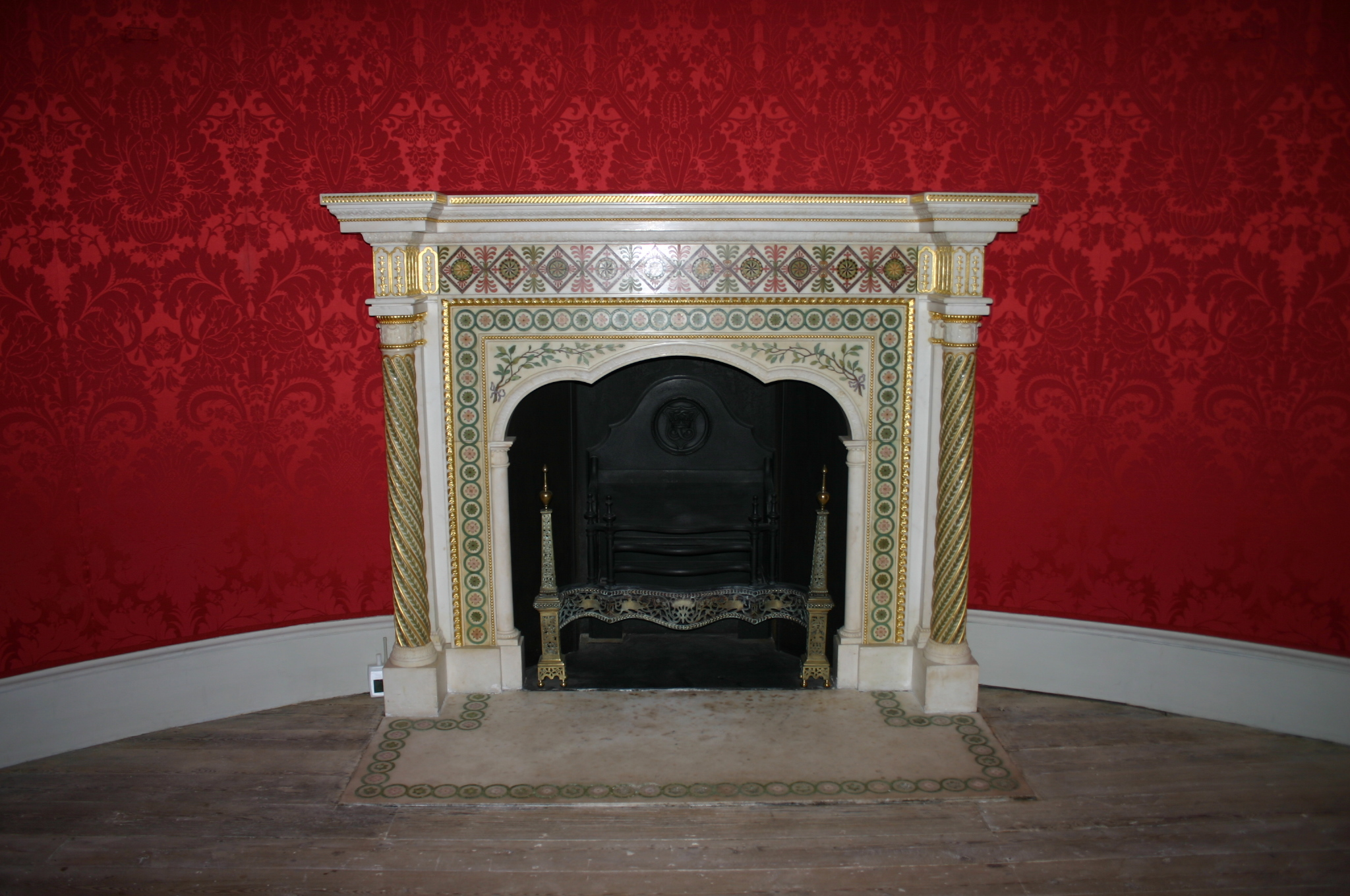
The Robert Adam fireplace in the round room

Walpole's eccentric and unique style in the inside rooms of Strawberry Hill complemented the Gothic exterior. The house is described by Walpole as "the scene that inspired the author of The Castle of Otranto", though Michael Snodin has observed: "it is an interesting comment on 18th-century sensibility that the melancholy interiors of The Castle of Otranto were suggested by the light, elegant, even whimsical rooms at Strawberry Hill".

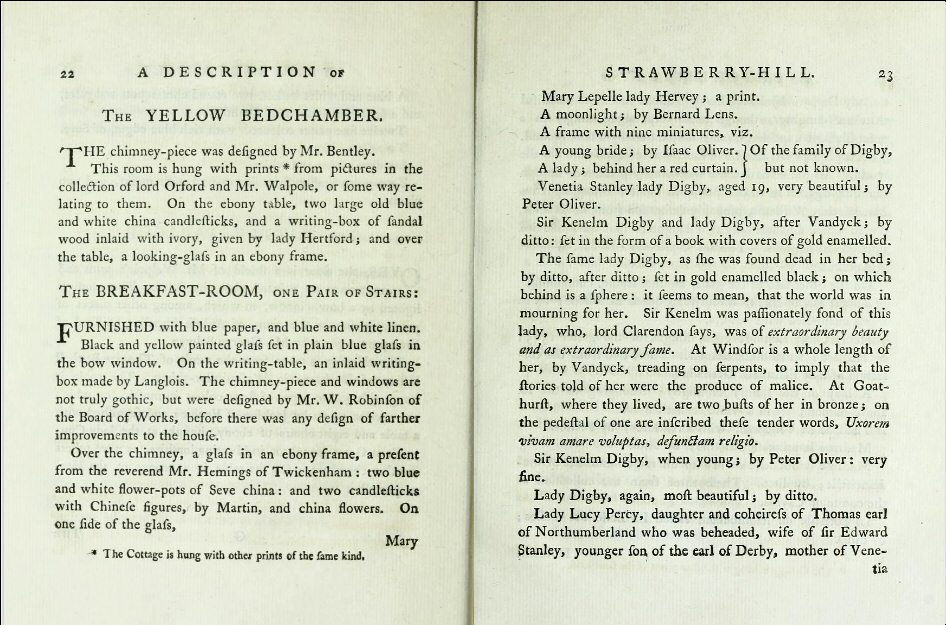
2-page spread from Walpole's A Description of Strawberry-Hill, 1774, itemising his collection. On the right-hand page is the gothic detail "[Portrait of] The same lady Digby, as she was found dead in her bed".

The interiors of Walpole's "little play-thing house" were intended to be "settings of Gothic 'gloomth' for Walpole's collection". His collection of curious singular antiquarian objects was well publicized; Walpole himself published two editions of A Description of the Villa of Mr. Horace Walpole at Strawberry Hill to make the "world aware of the extent of his collection".

Speaking on Walpole's collection, Clive Wainwright states that Walpole's collection "constituted an essential part of the interiors of his house". The character of the rooms at Strawberry Hill was "created and dictated" by Walpole's taste for antiquarianism. Though even without the collection present, the house "retains a fairy-tale quality".

Horace Walpole's Strawberry Hill Collection of several thousand items can still be viewed. The Lewis Walpole Library of Yale University now has a database which "encompasses the entire range of art and artifacts from Walpole's collections, including all items whose location is currently known and those as yet untraced but known through a variety of historical records".

=== Gardens ===
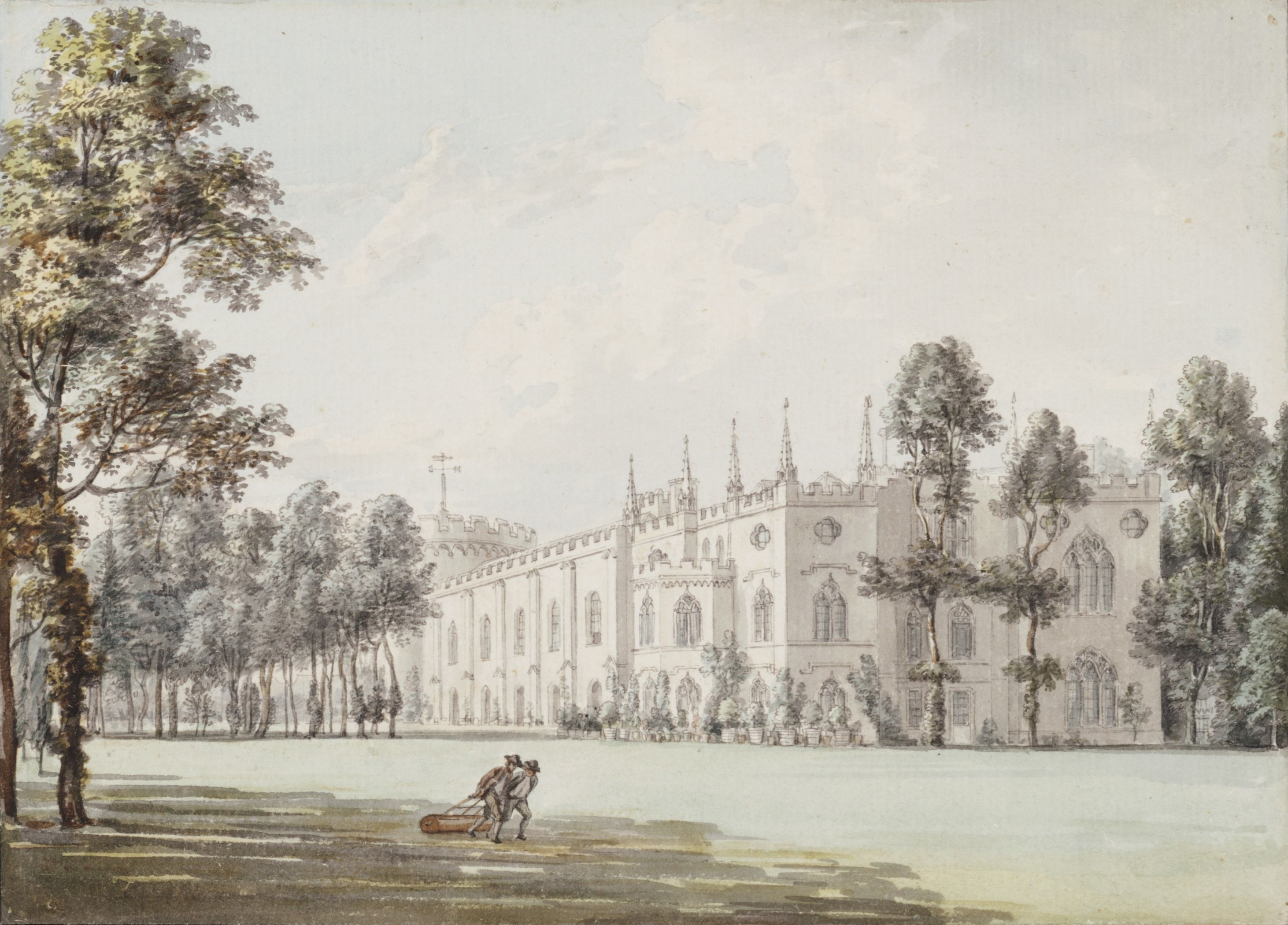
18th-century watercolour by Paul Sandby

Walpole was as meticulous in designing and developing his gardens as he was improving his house, though "his ignorance of horticulture at first embarrassed him a little". Improvements on the grounds were started even before work on the house. In an essay titled "On Modern Gardening", Walpole expresses his own ideas as reflected in his Strawberry Hill grounds. Walpole's taste in landscape and gardening moved away from the traditional, formal layout of "parterre, terraces, marble urns, statued fountains and 'canals measured by the line'". The French or Italian taste seemed, to Walpole, alien to the English climate "resulting in symmetrical and unnatural gardens". Trees and shrubs were planted in "natural groupings" on the lawn. Walpole preferred to see all nature as a garden. He did not however appreciate the extravagant "romantic grotto and that favourite eighteenth-century conceit, the hermitage".

From On Modern Gardening: "the fairest scenes, that depend on themselves alone, weary when often seen. The Doric portico, the Palladian bridge, the Gothic ruin, the Chinese pagoda, that surprise the stranger, soon lose their charms to their surfeited master. But the ornament whose merit soonest fades, is the hermitage, or scene adapted to contemplation. It is almost comic to set aside a quarter of one's garden to be melancholy in." Here, Walpole's separation of style between his house and grounds can be seen. A friend, Horace Mann, assumed that Walpole's garden would be similarly Gothic. Walpole responded; "Gothic is merely architecture, and as one has a satisfaction in imprinting the gloomth of abbeys and cathedrals on one's house, so one's garden, on the contrary, is to be nothing but riant, and the gaiety of nature".

Walpole saw the modern English garden as a point of perfection: "we have given the true model of gardening to the world; let other countries mimic or corrupt our taste; but let it reign here on its verdant throne, original by its elegant simplicity, and proud of no other art than that of softening nature's harshness and copying her graceful touch". He was a follower of William Kent, one of the originators of the English landscape garden.

The gardens are Grade II* listed on the Register of Historic Parks and Gardens.

==== Shell bench ====
One attraction of Walpole's gardens was a Rococo garden seat carved to resemble a large sea shell. "This shell was one of Mr. Walpole's favourite inventions – for Strawberry Hill was crammed with inventions and contrivances. It was a seat in the form of a huge bivalve of a species not easily recognized, which generally elicited a vast amount of wonder and admiration from his visitors". This bench, a rustic cottage, and a Chapel in the Wood show Walpole's charmingly eccentric taste.

The seat was originally placed at the corner of Walpole's estate, where Walpole and his visitors could view the river and the landscape beyond. Although only two drawings of the original bench survive, "the garden is as far as possible being restored to its original appearance. Walpole's extraordinary Shell Bench" was recreated in the 2012 restoration.

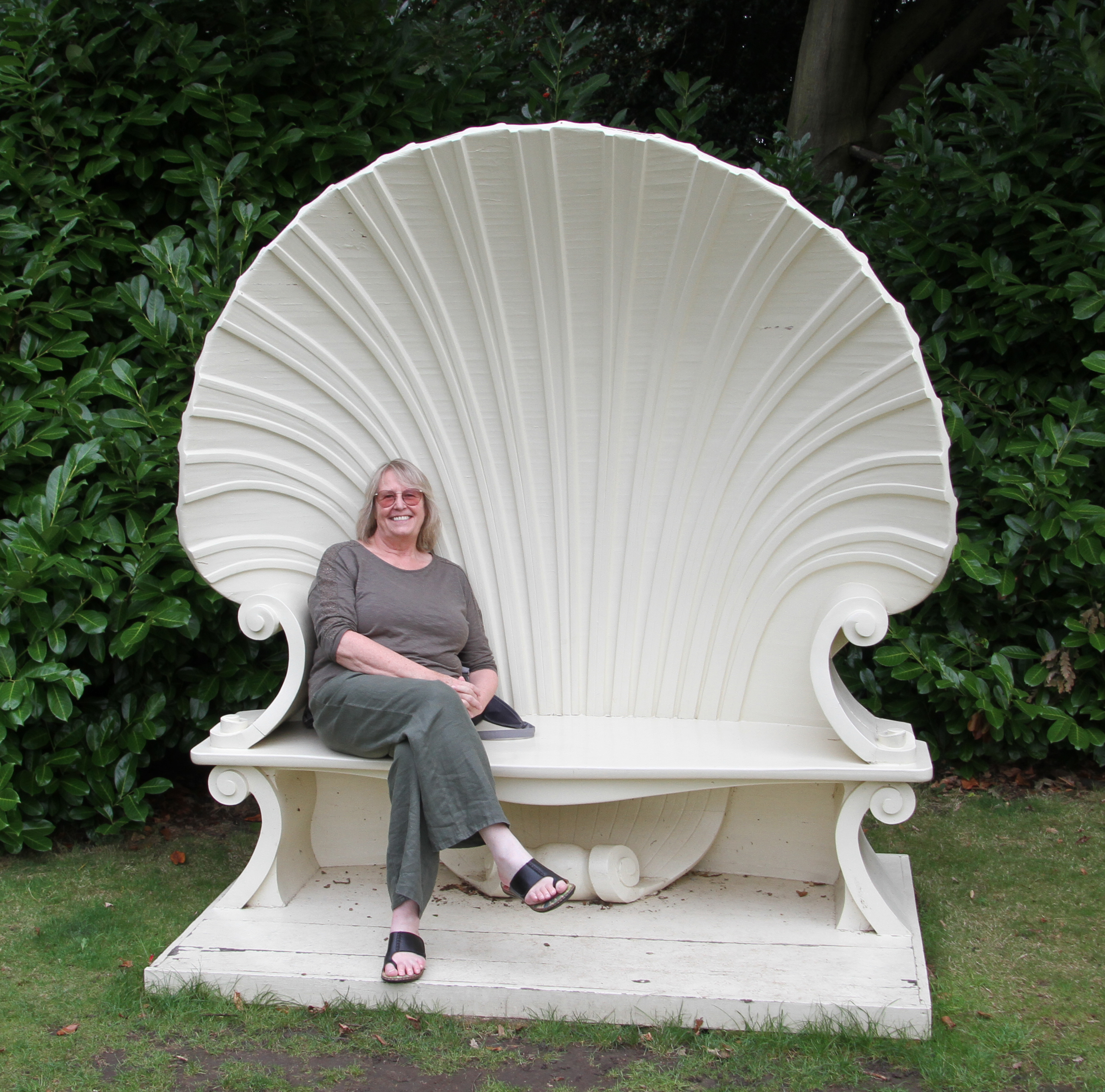
Recreated shell bench in the gardens of Strawberry Hill

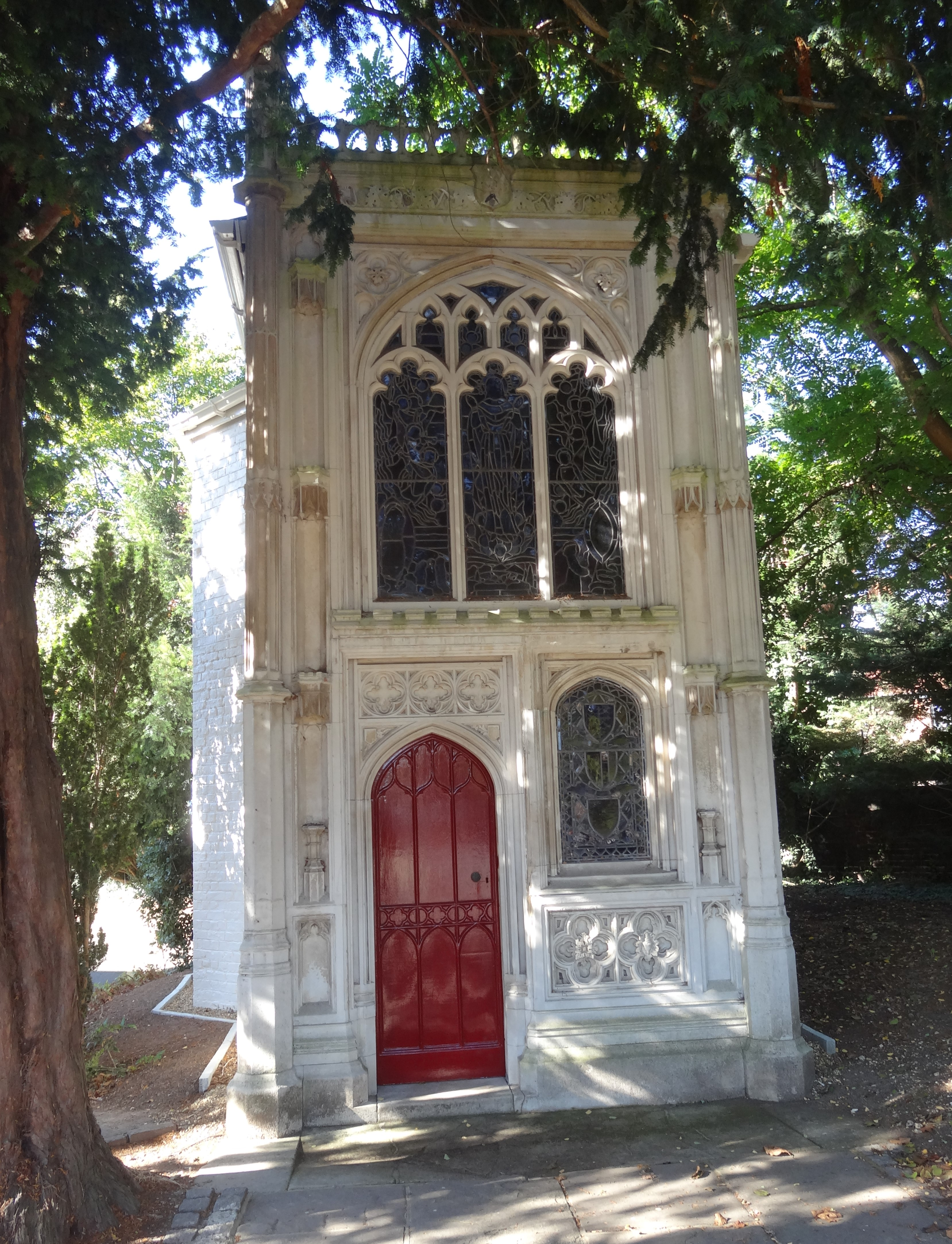
The Chapel in the Wood

=== Visitors ===
In Walpole's lifetime, Strawberry Hill drew many visitors to admire the architecture, grounds, and Walpole's carefully cultivated collection. According to Elliot Warburton, "Strawberry Hill in its new form soon became the marvel of the neighbourhood – a little later became the town talk – in a short time a theme of frequent comment even in distant parts of the country". "The highest personages of the realm" including the royal family came to visit Strawberry Hill, as well as more common sightseers. These visitors became an incessant presence at Strawberry Hill, and as delighted as Walpole was to share his vision, they became a bit of a nuisance to him. Although Walpole gave tours to the more important visitors, he shrank from less dignified attention and "retreated to his cottage in the flower garden" while his housekeeper gave tours to the public.

In a letter to George Montagu in 1763, Walpole complained: "I have but a minute's time in answering your letter, my house is full of people, and has been so from the instant I breakfasted, and more are coming – in short, I keep an inn; the sign, the Gothic Castle ... my whole time is passed in giving tickets for seeing it, and hiding myself when it is seen – take my advice, never build a charming house for yourself between London and Hampton-court, everybody will live in it but you." Warburton notes that while Walpole may have been annoyed from time to time, he also came to see his estate contributing to the public's enjoyment when he had doubts about his endeavour. "He arrives at the conclusion that all he has done is for the benefit of others rather than for himself".

=== Chronology ===
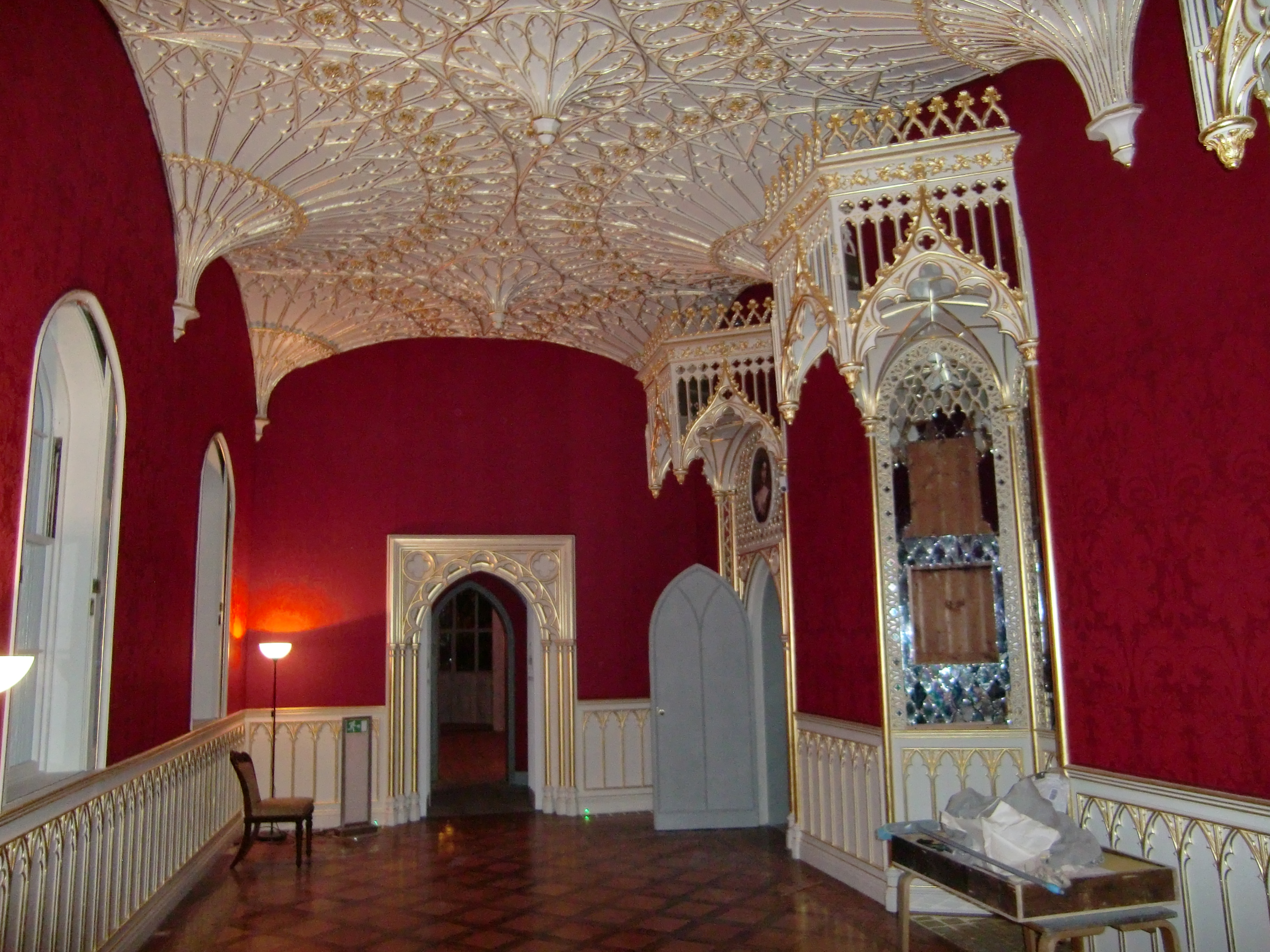
The Gallery, Strawberry Hill House

A list of important dates in Horace Walpole's life surrounding Strawberry Hill:

- 1739 – Sets off with Thomas Gray on the Grand Tour; visits France and Italy; meets John Chute in Florence
- 1745 – Father dies, leaving Horace his fortune and a house on Arlington Street
- 1747 – Finds and leases Strawberry Hill
- 1749 – Purchases Strawberry Hill
- 1750 – Forms the "Committee on Taste" with John Chute and Richard Bentley to start planning the Gothic development of Strawberry Hill
- 1753 – Building completed (first stage)
- 1757 – Sets up Strawberry Hill Press
- 1764 – The Castle of Otranto is published
- 1774 – Prints A Description of the Villa of Mr. Horace Walpole
- 1784 – Prints A Description of the Villa of Mr. Horace Walpole with new additions and illustrations

== Later owners ==
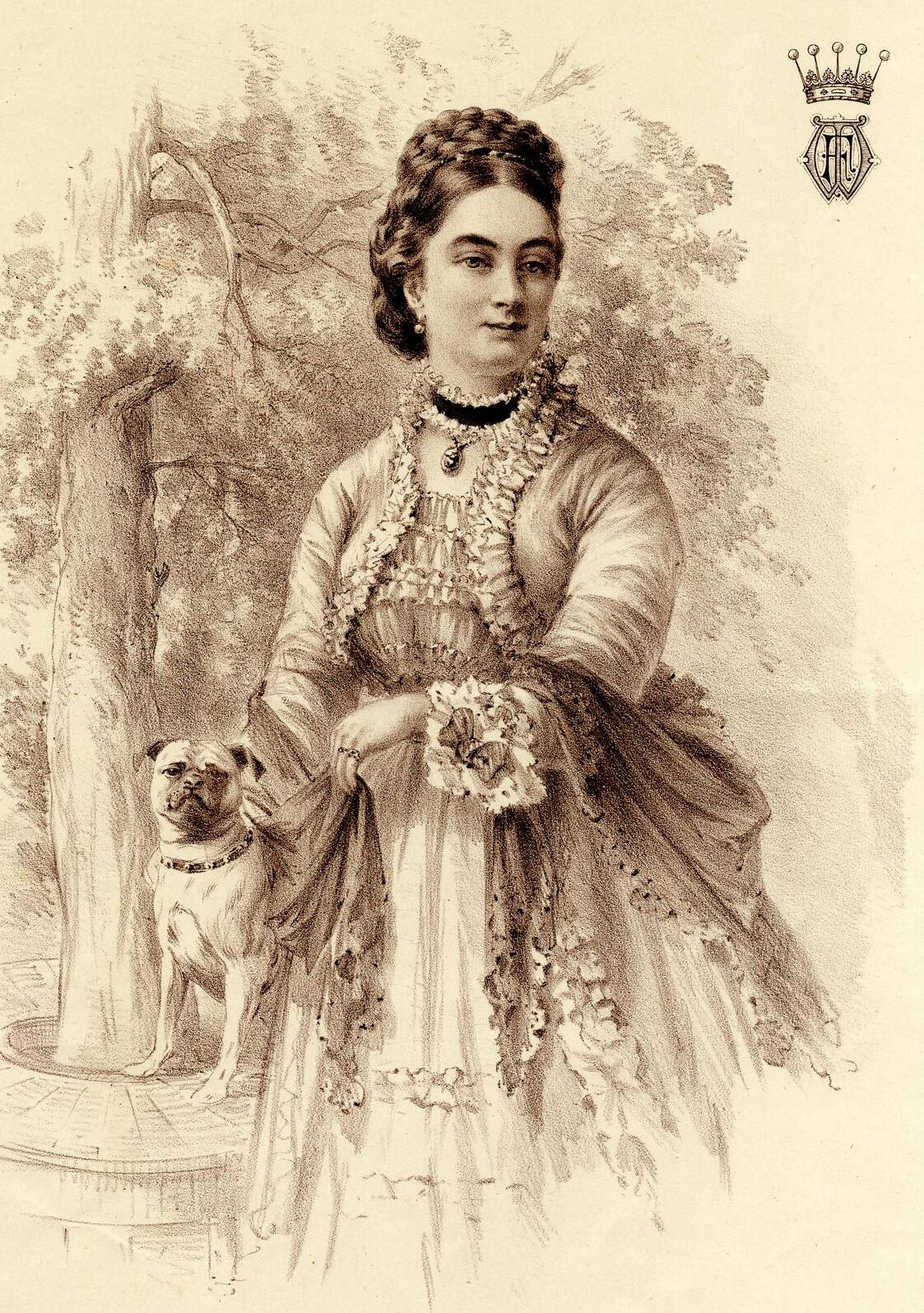
Frances Waldegrave restored and embellished the house from 1846 onwards.

After Walpole's death in 1797, the house passed first to his cousin Anne Seymour Damer, then to John Waldegrave, a grandson of Maria Walpole, the out-of-wedlock daughter of Walpole's older brother Edward. In the first half of the 19th century, two successive owners, brothers John and George Waldegrave, spent most of their family fortune, followed by a "Great Sale" lasting twenty-four days held in the grounds in 1842 which left the house stripped of virtually all its contents.

Upon the death of George Waldegrave on 28 September 1846, his wife Frances inherited the whole of the Waldegrave estates, including Strawberry Hill. She decided to restore the derelict estate in 1856. Her alterations included pushing the road back to create a semi-circular carriageway outside the main gate, opening up an interior route to the kitchen, fitting the vault's quatrefoils with stained glass (darkening the Hall), decorating the ceiling and Armoury niches with gold fleurs-de-lys and stars on blue ground, and building an extension. She revived the house and became its esteemed hostess, though she remained jealous that visitors to the house credited Walpole for its beauty rather than her hard work, writing that "Strawberry Hill is more like a fairy palace than ever. This sounds like boasting of my handiwork, but I feel inclined to do so, and I now constantly find young people thinking that Horace Walpole made all my pet creations."

From 1883 to 1887 the property was owned by Baron Hermann de Stern (1815–1887), a German-born British banker. His son Herbert Stern, 1st Baron Michelham, took over the house on his father's death, collecting fine art and furniture. The surviving embroidered Moorish-style ceiling in the Blue Breakfast Room is from his time. In 1923, it was bought by the Roman Catholic St Mary's University College. In 2014, it was renamed St Mary's University, Twickenham, for academic use.

== 21st century ==
=== Restoration ===
In 2003, Strawberry Hill was placed on the World Monuments Fund's list of the hundred most endangered structures. In 2004, it featured in the TV series Restoration, in which buildings bid for funding, to be voted on by viewers. The building was described at the time as in a poor state internally, with crumbling plasterwork, rotting timber, and a ceiling close to collapsing. The local member of parliament, Vince Cable, supported the bid. In 2007, the house was leased to the Strawberry Hill Trust for restoration and eventual opening to the public.

The collection at Horace Walpole's Strawberry Hill was featured at the Victoria & Albert Museum from March to July 2010 to prepare for the opening. Curator of the exhibition Michael Snodin saw Walpole as an influential figure in both collection and architecture: "He created a form of thematised historical display which prefigured modern museums. And Strawberry Hill was the most influential building of the early Gothic revival".

After a £9 million, two-year-long restoration, Strawberry Hill House reopened to the public on Saturday, 2 October 2010. Money was raised by supporters including the Heritage Lottery Fund.

In 2013, Strawberry Hill House won the European Union Prize for Cultural Heritage in the Europa Nostra Awards. The Walpole Trust re-opened Strawberry Hill to the public on 1 March 2015. Since then, it has run a programme of events and exhibitions in the house and gardens.

=== Lost Treasures of Strawberry Hill exhibition ===
Between October 2018 and February 2019, the house was repopulated with some 150 artworks from Horace Walpole's collection. Having been dispersed in the great sale of 1842, they were in museums and private collections around the world, and brought back to their exact locations in Strawberry Hill House, as mapped in Walpole's detailed plans of each room.

The curators suggest that some of the portraits, such as Peter Lely's "sensual" A Boy as a Shepherd, as well as those of Walpole's male friends, imply that he was homosexual.

Other objects suggest a gothic sensibility, such as the clock which Henry VIII gave to his second wife Anne Boleyn, who was later beheaded; the critic Jonathan Jones of The Guardian calls this "truly spooky", like the 500-year-old red cardinal's hat that Walpole believed, most probably correctly, had belonged to Cardinal Wolsey. But in Jones's opinion, the "most gothic" painting exhibited was by Walpole's contemporary, William Hogarth: his 1733 portrait of the triple murderer Sarah Malcolm in prison.

Major works returned to the house for the exhibition

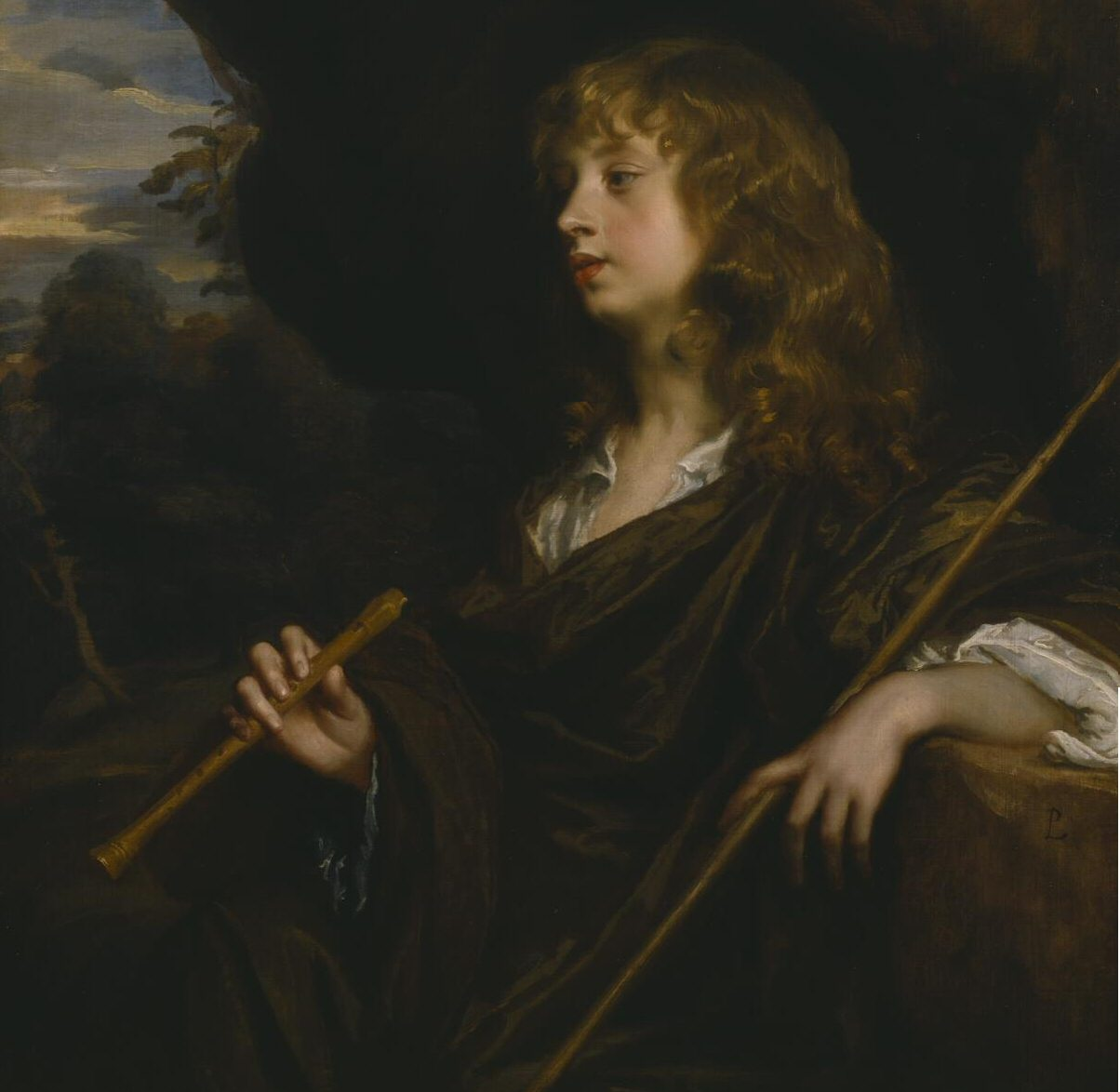
A Boy as a Shepherd
Sir Peter Lely c. 1659

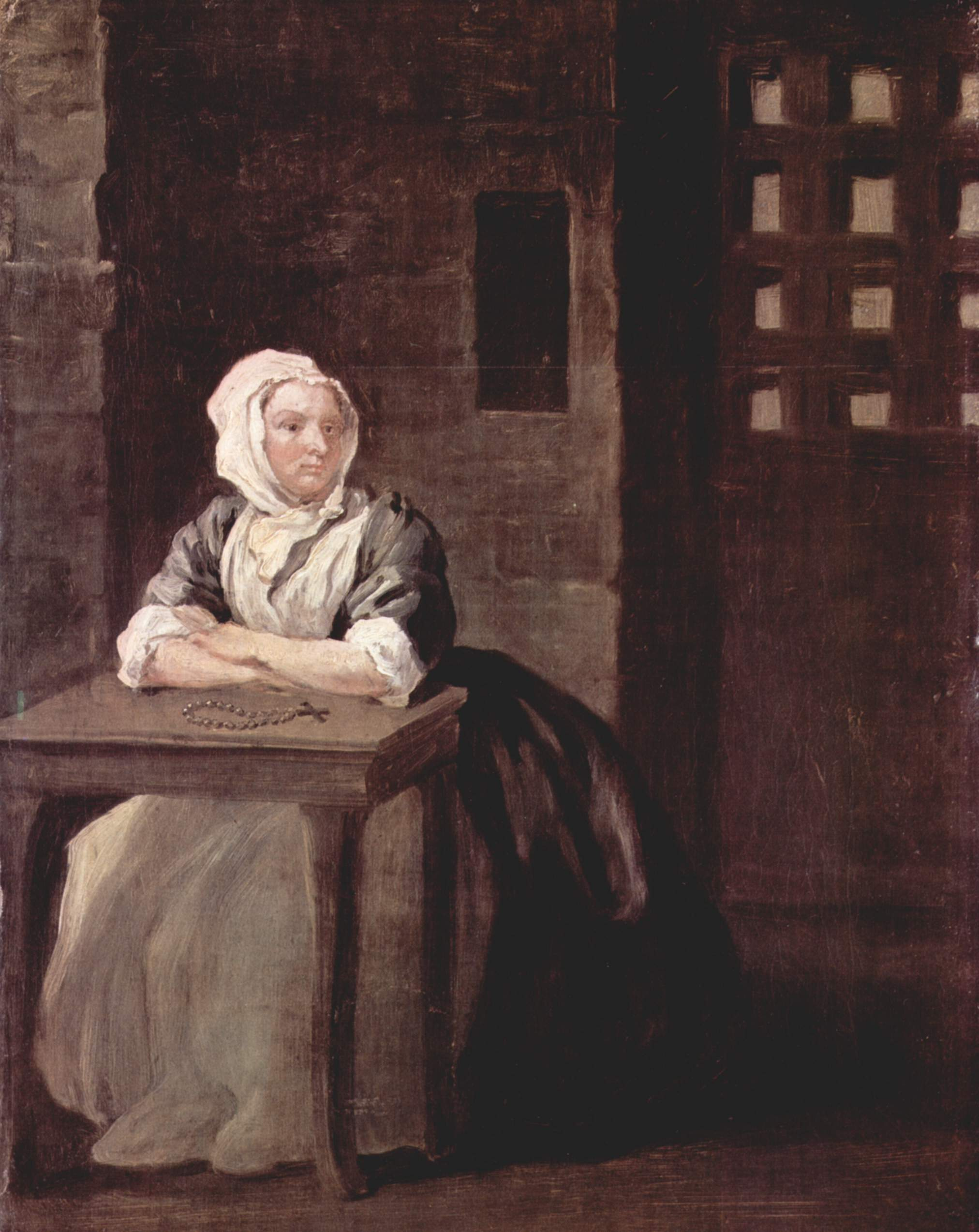
Portrait of Sarah Malcolm in prison
William Hogarth, 1733

== Strawberry Hill Gothic ==
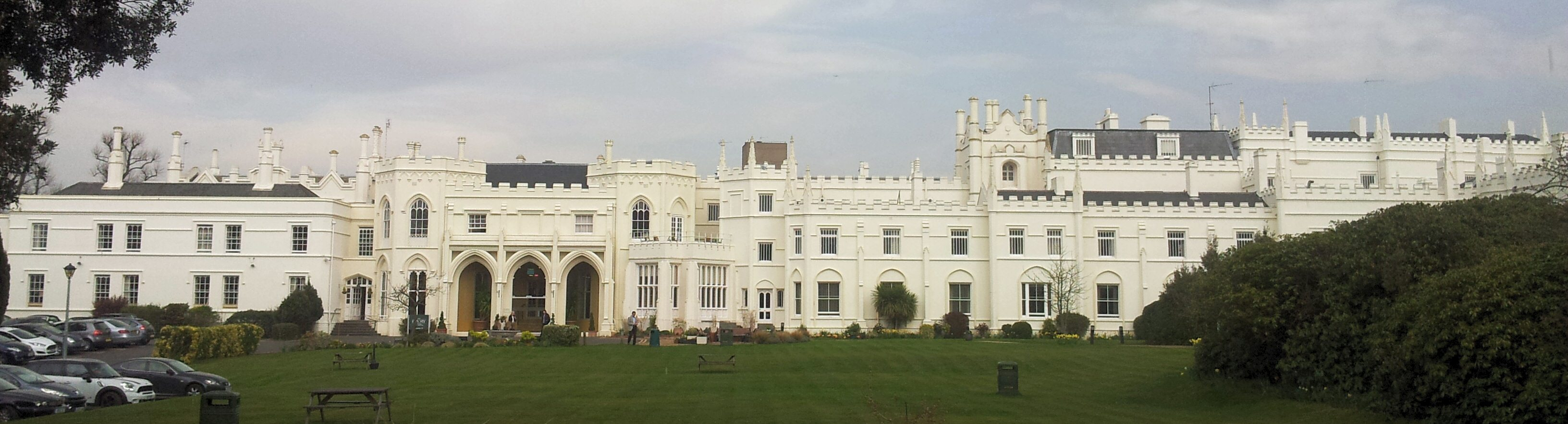
The Priory Hospital, Roehampton, built in Strawberry Hill Gothic, 1811

The Strawberry Hill Gothic architectural style became briefly popular, though the researcher Peter Lindfield has argued that the term is not satisfactory for "any Georgian Gothic output" as the houses it has been applied to are varied in style and "have almost nothing in common with the form, appearance, and decoration of Strawberry Hill". Houses built or refronted supposedly in the style include:

- Braziers Park, a South Oxfordshire country house built by Daniel Harris in 1688, re-fronted in the Gothic style in 1799; Lindfield argues that it was influenced more by "very Gothic Oxford" where Harris lived and worked, than by Strawberry Hill House.
- Chalfont Park, Buckinghamshire, rebuilt in 1760 to designs by John Chute.
- Donnington Park, Berkshire, a house designed by John Chute in 1763.
- Houghton Lodge, a fishing lodge in Hampshire, built around 1800 in the Cottage orné style, influenced by Strawberry Hill.
- Lee Priory, Kent, by James Wyatt 1780–1790, destroyed in the 1950s.
- Priory Hospital in Roehampton, which was built in the Strawberry Hill Gothic style in 1811.

== Sources ==
- Calloway, Stephen; Snodin, Michael; Wainwright, Clive (1980). Horace Walpole and Strawberry Hill. Richmond upon Thames: Orleans House Gallery.
- Fothergill, Brian (1983). The Strawberry Hill Set: Horace Walpole and His Circle. London: Faber and Faber.
- Iddon, John (2011). Strawberry Hill & Horace Walpole: Essential Guide. Scala Publishers. ISBN 978-1857596571.
- Snodin, Michael, ed. (2009). Horace Walpole's Strawberry Hill. New Haven and London: Yale University Press.
- Walpole, Horace; Amery, Colin (1931). On Modern Gardening. New York: Young Books.
- Walpole, Horace (1960). Lewis, W. S.; Smith, Warrent Hunting; Lam, George L. (eds.). Horace Walpole's Correspondence with Sir Horace Mann. Horace Walpole's Correspondence. Vol. XX. New Haven: Yale University Press. p. 372. LCCN 54013338. OCLC 486501 – via Internet Archive.
- Warburton, Elliot (1851). Memoirs of Horace Walpole and His Contemporaries. London: Henry Colburn.
