= List of projects by James Stirling =

This is a complete list of projects by James Stirling, a British architect and his associates

- Built projects: the first date is year of initial design and the second is year of completion.
- Projects marked (C) are competitions.

== Projects designed under the name of James Stirling ==
Source: "James Stirling: buildings and projects"

- 1950 University thesis: Community Centre
- 1950 Honan Competition (C)
- 1951 ICA Furniture
- 1951 Core and crosswall house
- 1951 Stiff Dom-ino Housing
- 1952 Poole Technical College
- 1953 House in North London
- 1953 Sheffield University (with Alan Cordingley)
- 1954 Woolton House, near Liverpool
- 1955 Village Housing project (for Team X -CIAM)

== Projects designed under the name of "James Stirling and James Gowan" ==
- Built 1955-58 Flats at Langham House Close, Ham Common, Richmond upon Thames, Surrey (London)
- Built 1956 ? No.16 & 17 Grosvenor Square, London
- 1956 ? Housing estate at Baddow near Maidenhead (85 dwellings)
- 1956 ? Shops and maisonettes, Hornchurch
- Built: 1956-58 Cowes, Isle of Wight: house for an artist
- 1956 House in the Chilterns
- 1956 House studies
- Built: 1957-59 Southwell Gardens, London SW7: house conversion
- 1957 Expandable house
- 1957 Three houses at Hyde Park Gate, London, for Basil Mavrolean
- Built: 1957? No.11 St. Christopher's Place, London W1
- 1957? Prototype house for an estate in St.John's Wood, London
- 1957? Langham House (expansion of Ham Common Flats)
- Built: 1957-59 Public housing, Avenham, Preston, Lancashire (with LyonsIsrael and Ellis)
- Built: 1958? Five houses in Stoke Newington, London
- Built: 1958? LCC School Meals conversion, Eltham (ref.as above)
- Built: 1958? Semi-detached houses at Sunninghill for a speculative builder
- Built: 1958? Two housing schemes
- 1958 Churchill College, Cambridge University (C)
- 1958 Steel mill cladding
- Built: 1958-62 School dining and assembly hall, Camberwell, London
- 1959 Selwyn College, Cambridge University (C)
- Built: 1959-63 Leicester, England: University Faculty of Engineering
- Built: 1960-64 Children's home, 11-12 Frogmore, Putney, London SW18
- Built: 1960-64 "Perrygrove" old peoples' home for the LCC, Blackheath, London

== Additional projects designed under the name of James Stirling ==
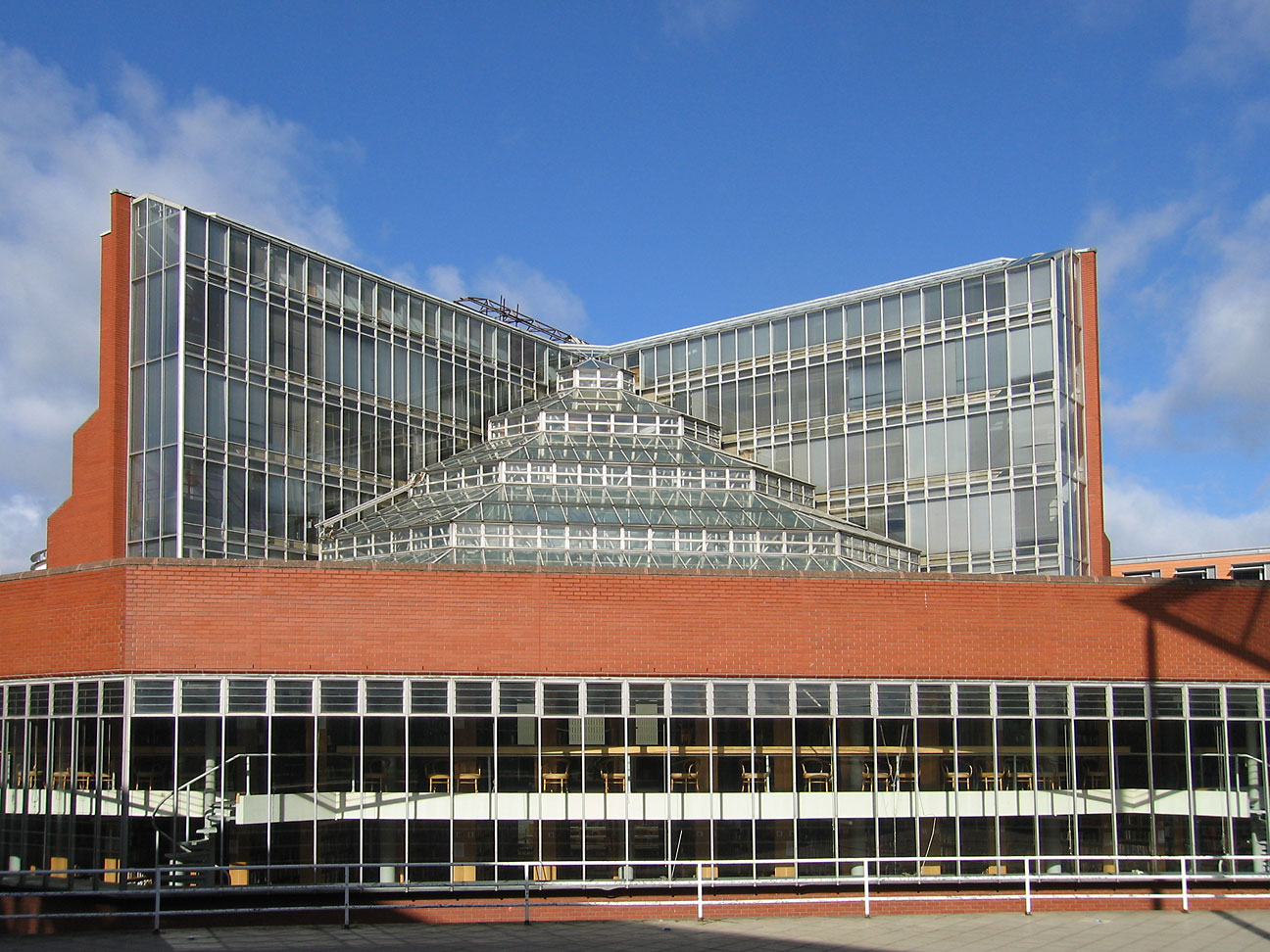
Seeley Historical Library, Cambridge (1964-67)

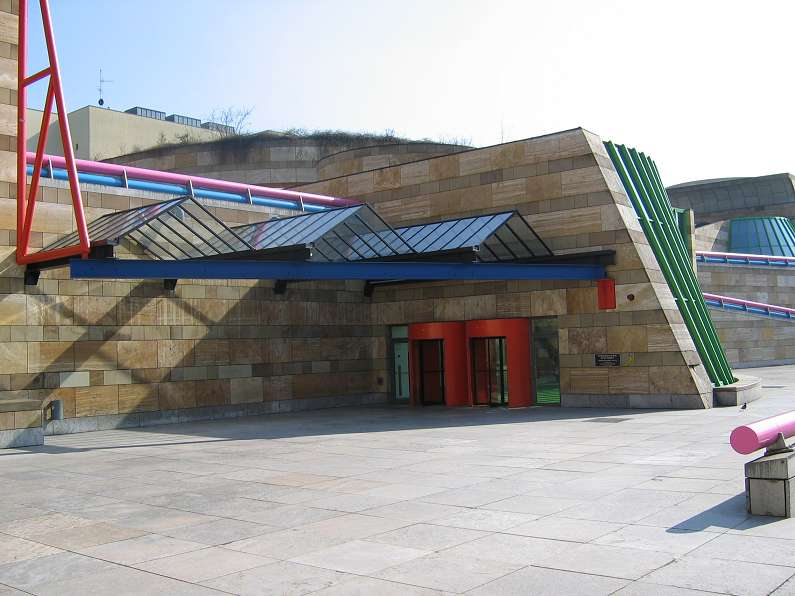
Neue Staatsgalerie, Stuttgart (1977-83)

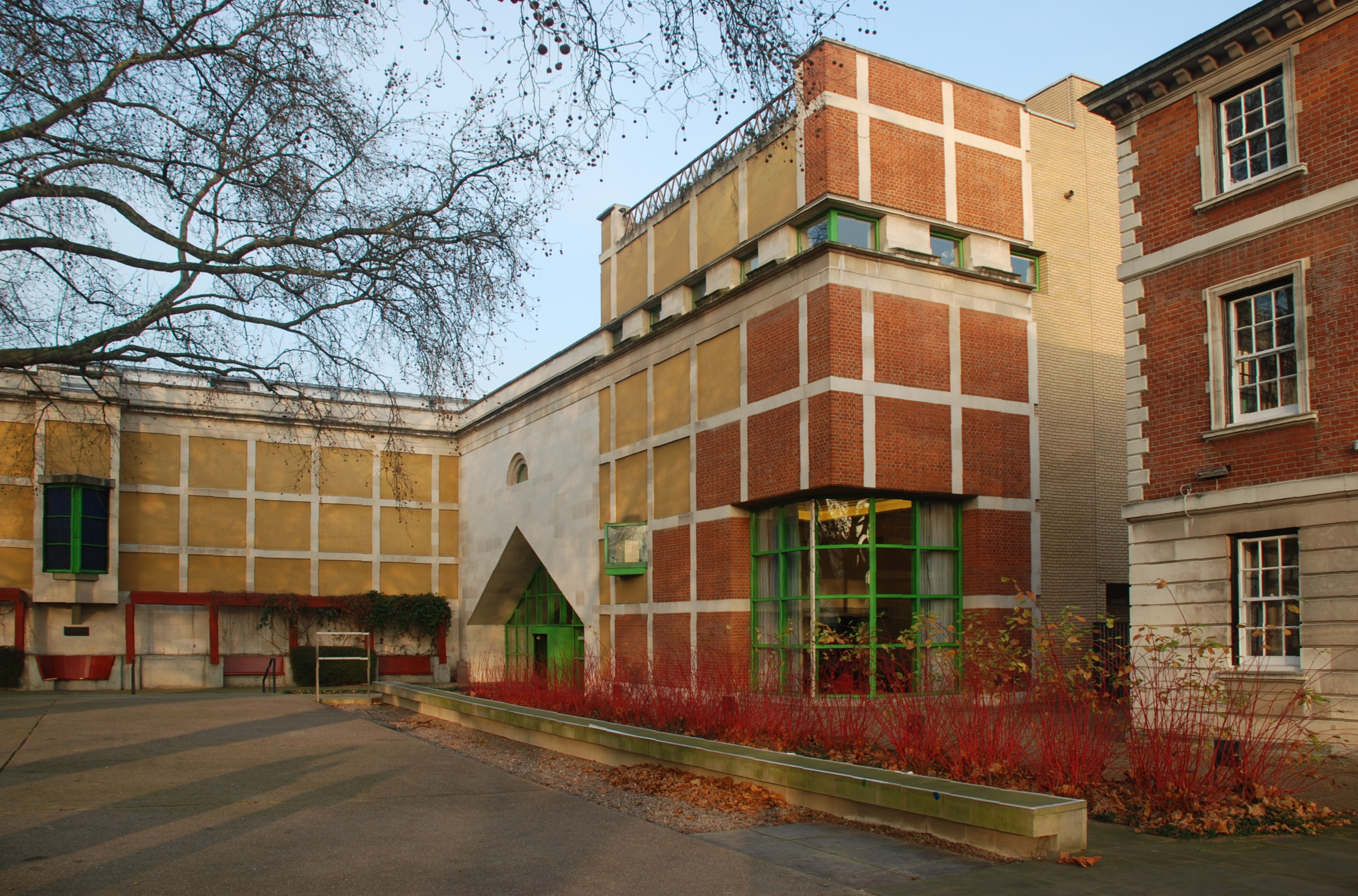
Clore Gallery, London (1980-87)

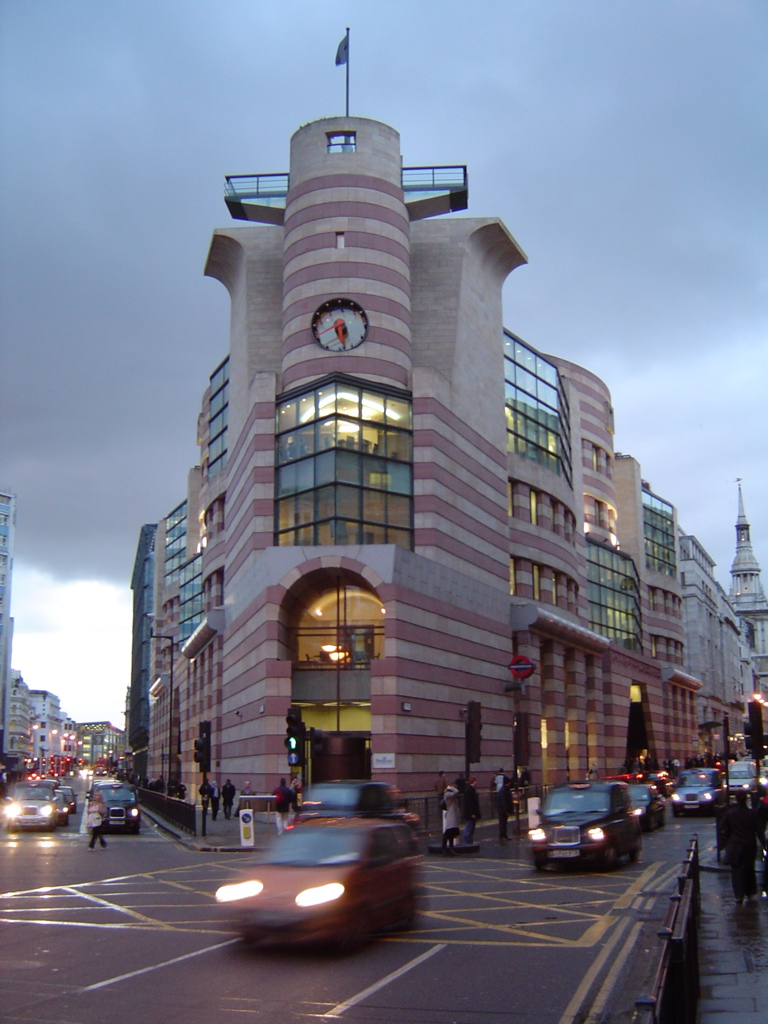
1 Poultry, London (designed 1986, built posthumously)

Temasek Polytechnic, Singapore (1991 - completed posthumously)

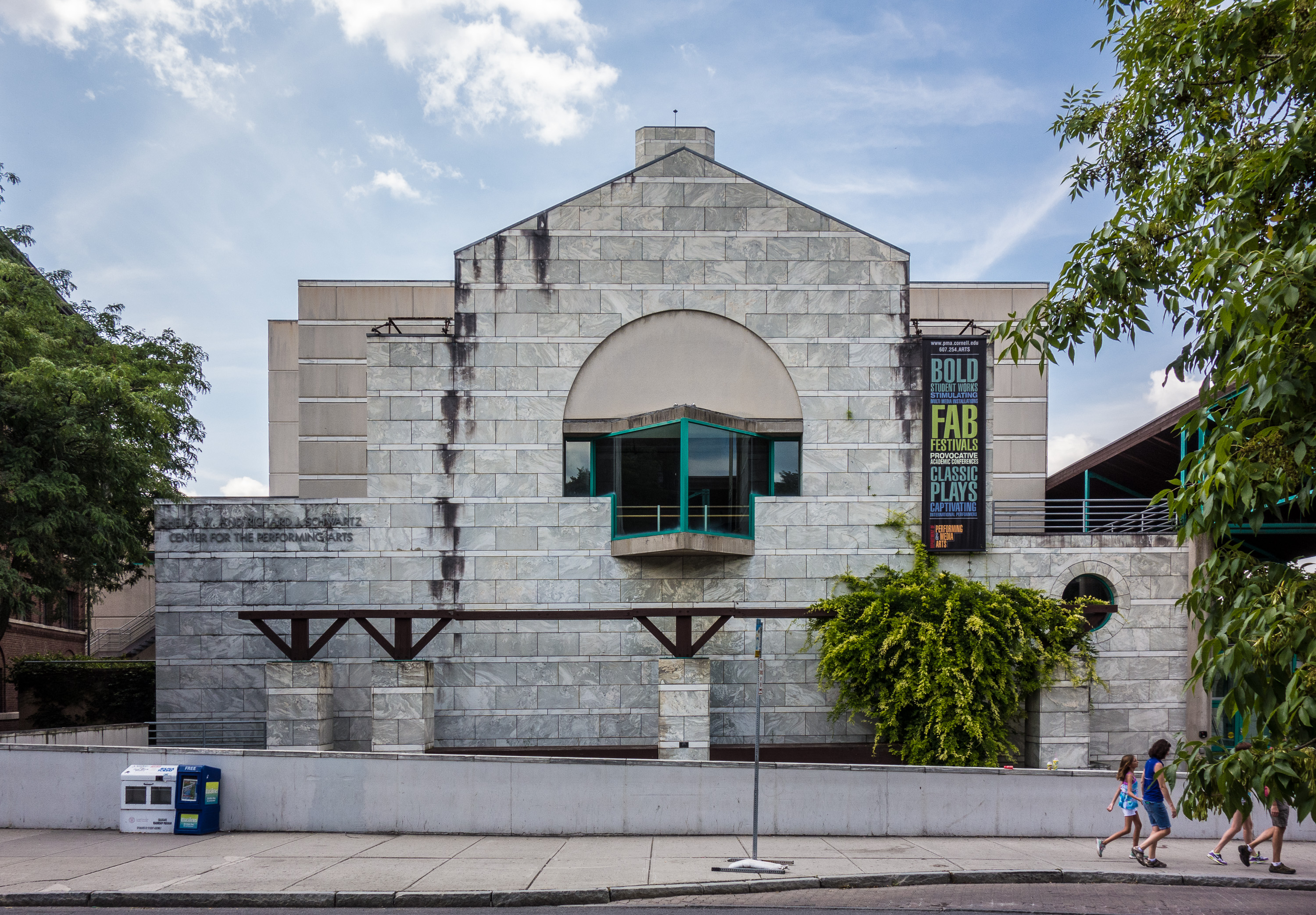
Schwartz Center for the Performing Arts at Cornell University

- Built: 1964-67 Cambridge University: History Faculty Building (C)
- Built: 1964-68 Flats at Camden Town
- Built: 1964-68 St. Andrews University, Scotland: student residences
- 1965 Middlesbrough, England: new headquarters for Dorman Long Steel
- Built: 1966-71 Florey Building (Oxford University: Halls of Residence, Queen's College)
- Built: 1967-76 Runcorn New Town (Liverpool): public housing
- 1968 New York: redevelopment study for Manhattan (with Arthur Baker)
- Built: 1969 Lima, Peru: P.R.E.V.I. (U.N. low-cost housing pilot project) (C)
- Built: 1969-72 Haslemere, England: Olivetti Training Centre
- 1969 Munich: headquarters for Siemens AG (C)
- 1970 Derby, England: new civic centre (C)

== Projects designed by Stirling and Michael Wilford ==
- 1971 Milton Keynes, England: new headquarters for British Olivetti (C)
- 1971 St. Andrews University, Scotland: Arts Centre
- Built: 1972-77 Runcorn New Town, England: Southgate Housing (demolished)
- 1975 Düsseldorf: Nordrhein-Westfalen Museum (C)
- 1975 Cologne: Wallraf-Richartz Museum (C)
- 1976 Berlin: Hotel in Meinecke Strasse
- 1976 Doha, Qatar: Government Centre (C)
- 1976 Florence: Administrative and Business Centre (C)
- 1977 Nairobi, Kenya: UNEP Headquarters
- 1977 "Roma Interrotta": theoretical revisions to Giambattista Nolli's plan of Rome
- 1977 Marburg, Germany: Dresdner Bank
- 1977 Rotterdam: redevelopment study for Müller Pier
- Built: 1977-83 Stuttgart: Neue Staatsgalerie /Workshop Theatre (C)
- 1978 Tehran: Biology and Biochemistry Institute
- 1978 Monheim, Germany: headquarters for Bayer AG (C)
- 1978 New York: eleven townhouses on East 67th St. (C)
- Built: 1979-81 Rice University, Texas: School of Architecture extension
- Built: 1979-87 Berlin: Social Science Research Center Berlin (Wissenschaftszentrum -WZB) (C)
- Built: 1979-84 Harvard University: Arthur M. Sackler Museum
- 1980 New York: Columbia University Chemistry Department
- Built: 1980-87 London: Clore Gallery for the Turner Collection (Tate Gallery)
- 1980 Stuttgart: Music Academy
- 1981 Houston Circle, Texas
- Built: 1983-88 Ithaca, USA: Cornell University Schwartz Center for the Performing Arts
- 1983 Bologna, Italy: new town centre for Casalecchio
- 1983 Turin, Italy: re-use of FiatT Lingotto factory (C)
- 1983 Milton Keynes, England: new headquarters for British Telecom (C)
- 1983 Latina, Italy: Municipal Library
- Built: 1984-88 Liverpool, England: Tate Gallery (much destroyed by later alterations)
- 1985 London: Museums of New Art, Tate Gallery
- 1985 Bilbao: Abando Transport Interchange
- 1985 London: National Gallery Extension (C)
- 1986 Office and commercial building at No 1 Poultry, City of London (this project was developed by others, from initial work by Stirling, and built posthumously)
- BUILT: 1986-92 Melsungen, Germany: production and distribution centre for Braun AG (C) (initial concept only; project then developed by Walter Naegeli)
- 1986 Lugano, Switzerland: extension to the Thyssen Gallery (C)
- 1986 Stuttgart: extension to State Theatre scenery workshop (C)
- 1987 Aachen: Kaiserplatz
- 1987 London: Study Centre and Library (Tate Gallery)
- BUILT: 1987 Stuttgart: Music School and Theatre Academy (this project was developed by others, from initial work by Stirling, and built posthumously 1993-1994)
- 1987 Milan: Palazzo Citterio Art Gallery (Brera Museum)
- 1988 Glyndebourne, England: Opera House Extension (C)
- Built: 1988 Irvine: Science Library, University of California, Irvine (this project was developed by others, from initial work by Stirling, and built posthumously)
- 1988 Toronto: Ballet and Opera House (C)
- 1988 Los Angeles: Disney Philharmonic Hall (C)
- 1988 London: 5-7 Carlton Gardens
- 1988 London: redevelopment of Paternoster Square (C)
- 1988 London: Bracken House (C)
- 1988 Seville: Stadium Development
- 1989 Paris: Bibliothèque de France (C)
- 1989 Compton Verney, England: Opera House (C)
- BUILT: 1989-91 Venice: Bookshop in the Biennale Gardens (with Thomas Muirhead)
- 1990 Philadelphia: Orchestra Hall (C)
- 1990 Venice: building for the Venice Film Festival (C)
- 1990 London: Channel 4 Television (C)
- 1991 Poplar Dock, London
- 1991 Kyoto Centre, Japan (C)
- 1991 Edinburgh: Museum of Scotland (C)
- Built: 1991 Singapore: Temasek Polytechnic (this project was developed by others, from initial work by Stirling, and built posthumously)
- Built: 1992 Salford, Greater Manchester, England: Arts Centre (this project was developed by others, from initial work by Stirling, and built posthumously)
