= Langham House, Ham =

Langham House
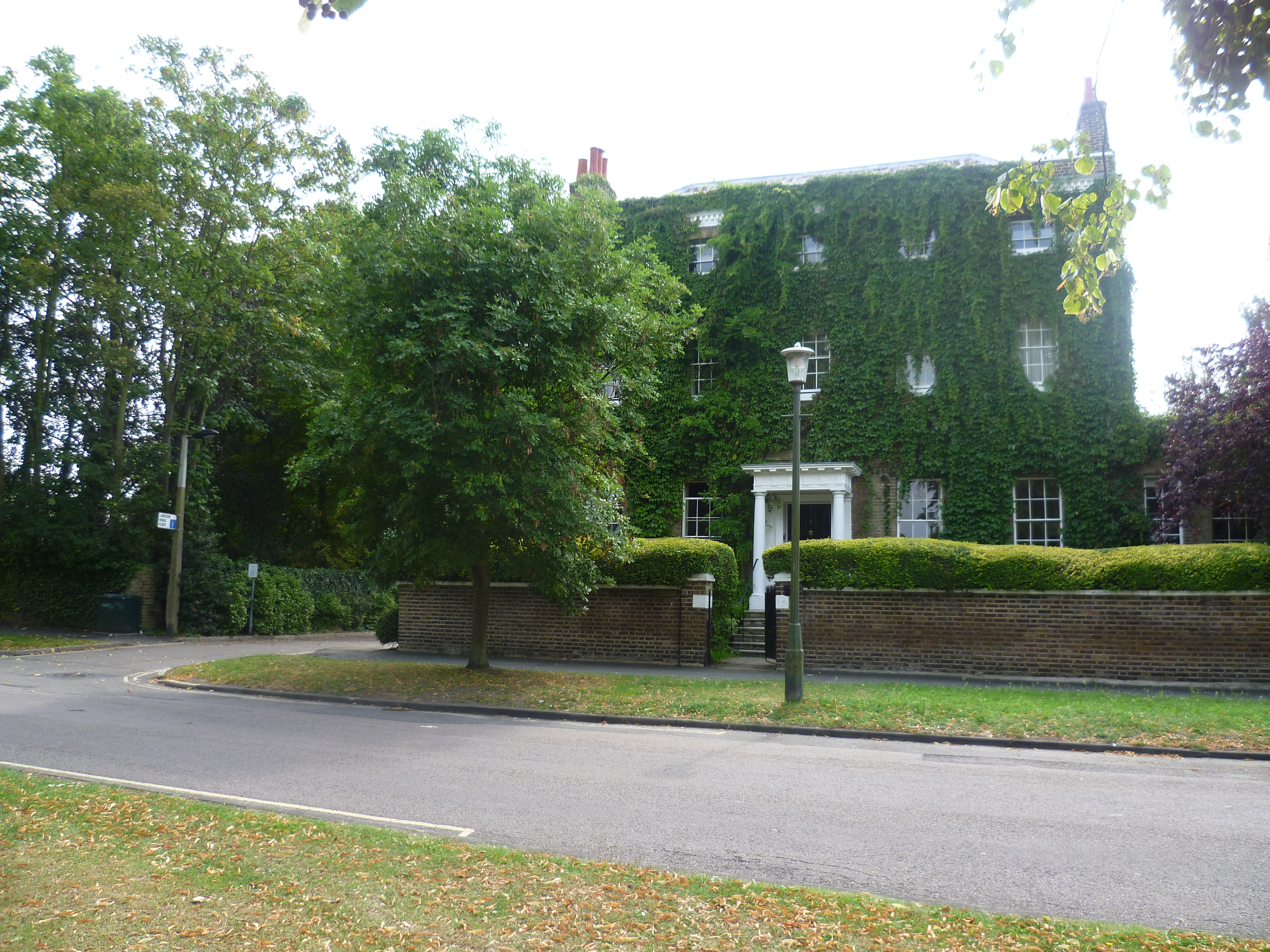
- Langham House

- Location within London Borough of Richmond upon Thames

General information
- Status: Completed
- Type: house
- Architectural style: Georgian
- Location: Ham Common, London, TW10 7JE, England
- Coordinates: 51°26′1.66″N 0°18′32.95″W
- Completed: 1709

Technical details
- Material: stock brick
- Floor count: 3

Listed Building – Grade II
- Official name: Langham House
- Designated: 10 January 1950
- Reference no.: 1080830

Langham House is a Grade II-listed house facing Ham Common in the London Borough of Richmond upon Thames. It was built in about 1709 and former home of several notable residents.

== Location ==
Langham House is located on Ham Street, on the west side of Ham Common in Ham, London. It is adjacent and to the north of the Grade II-listed Cassel Hospital.

== Description ==
Langham House is a three-storey house with cellar, built of stock brick, five sash windows wide. It has stucco corbel cornice below the parapet and a Doric porch. It has a single-storey and one window wide wing to the right which has a side door with a rusticated stone surround and pediment. Langham Cottage, adjacent to the north, completely rebuilt in 1974, was originally the coach house.

== History ==
Langham House dates from about 1709. It has had several notable former residents during its three-century history.

George Hay, 7th Marquess of Tweeddale lived at the house between 1780 and 1790.

Charles Edgeworth, half-brother of Irish author Maria Edgeworth, resided at the house in 1851. Active within the parish, along with his neighbour, Gordon Forbes, he was involved in the management of the National Orphan Home on other side of the Common.

First Sea Lord, John Fisher leased the house from 1904 on appointment as First Sea Lord, though also granted an official residence at Queen Anne's Gate. He and his wife remained in Ham until after Fisher was appointed Baron Fisher in 1909 and retirement as First Sea Lord in 1910. Almost at the same time, Fisher's son, Cecil, inherited the Vavasseur fortune and the whole family relocated to Kilverstone Hall, Norfolk.

Air Vice-Marshal, Philip Game resided at the house in 1937.

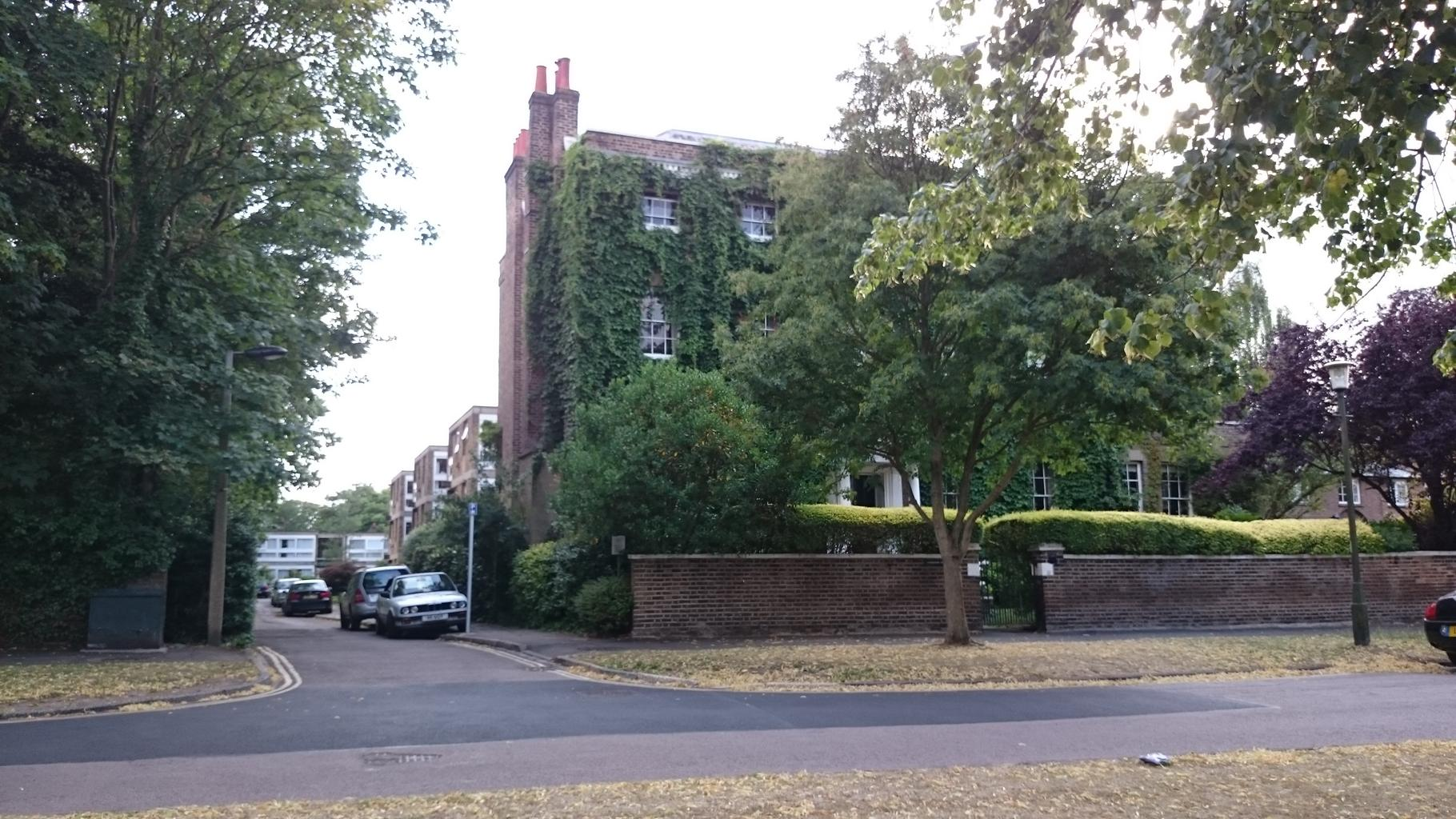
Langham House and Langham House Close

The property, like many in the area, was part of the Dysart and Tollemache family estate. Langham House became home to Sir Lyonel Tollemache, 4th Baronet and his son, Cecil, following their donation of Ham House to the National Trust in 1948. The house was listed Grade II in January 1950. After Lyonel's death at the house in 1953, the house and garden were sold separately, Langham House was converted from a single dwelling into flats and the garden plot was sold for development on a 999-year lease in 1955. The land to the south of the house became the access road for the Grade II*-listed Langham House Close development, designed by Stirling and Gowan in 1956; this was built on the garden plot behind the house, between 1957 and 1958, and is considered an exemplar of Brutalist architecture.

== See also ==
- Langham House Close
