= Frank Newby =

British structural engineer (1926–2001)

- Born: 26 March 1926; Barnsley, Yorkshire, England
- Died: 10 May 2001 (aged 75); London, England
- Education: Trinity College, Cambridge
- Engineering career
- Discipline: Structural engineer
- Institutions: Institution of Structural Engineers
- Practice name: F J Samuely & Partners
- Projects: Skylon (Festival of Britain) (with Felix Samuely) University of Leicester Engineering Building Regent's Park Zoo Aviary
- Awards: IStructE Gold Medal

Frank Newby (26 March 1926 – 10 May 2001) was one of the leading structural engineers of the 20th century, working with such architects as Philip Powell and Hidalgo Moya, Eero Saarinen, Cedric Price, James Gowan (architect) James Stirling, and the practice of Skidmore, Owings and Merrill (SOM), and such engineers as Ove Arup and Felix Samuely.

== Early life and education ==
Frank Newby was born in Barnsley on 26 March 1926. He studied "mechanical sciences", now known as engineering, at Trinity College, Cambridge between 1943 and 1947. He undertook National Service from 1947 to 1949.

== Working life ==
=== Early career ===
In 1949 Frank Newby joined the engineering consultancy firm of Felix Samuely in London. With Felix Samuely, he worked on the design of the Skylon for the 1951 Festival of Britain, a structure which became the symbol of the festival.

He spent 1952 in the United States, funded by a National Security Alliance scholarship, where he worked with exponents of the modern movement such as Charles Greaves and Fred Scriven. Travelling across the United States, he interned in several of the most interesting offices, including Saarinen in Michigan, Bertrand Goldberg in Chicago, and Charles and Ray Eames in California. He rejoined Samuely's practice in 1953.

During his early career, Newby was inspired by the work of Felix Samuely and Ove Arup, the leading structural engineers of their day.

=== Later career ===
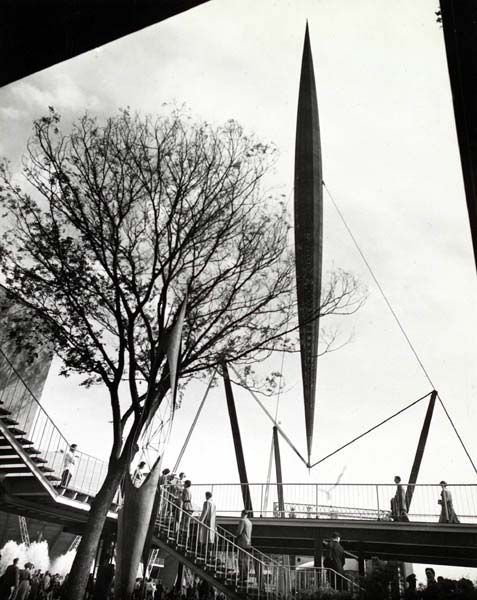
The Skylon at the Festival of Britain, 1951 (image from Museum of London)

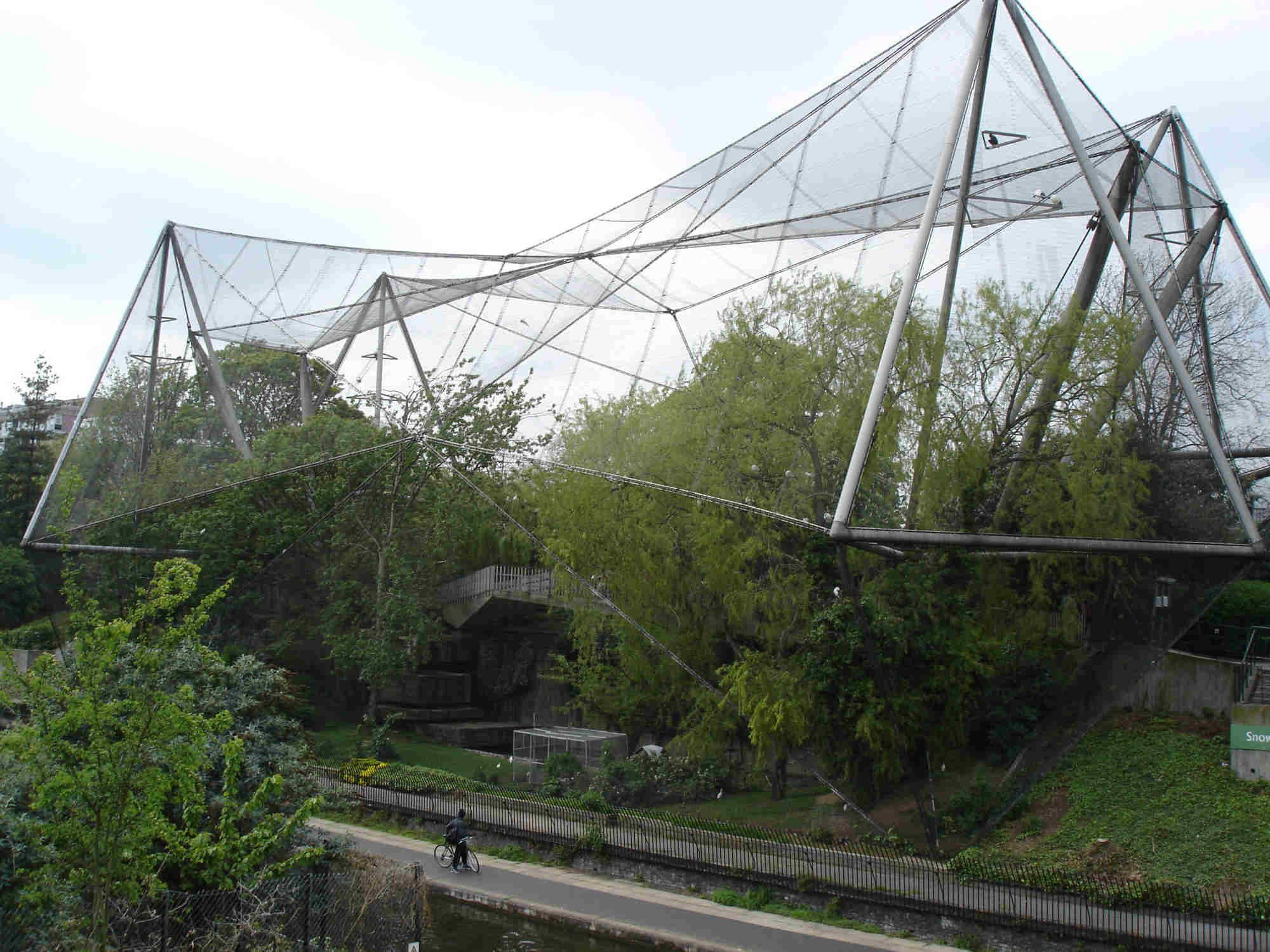
The giant ZSL London Zoo aviary designed with Cedric Price

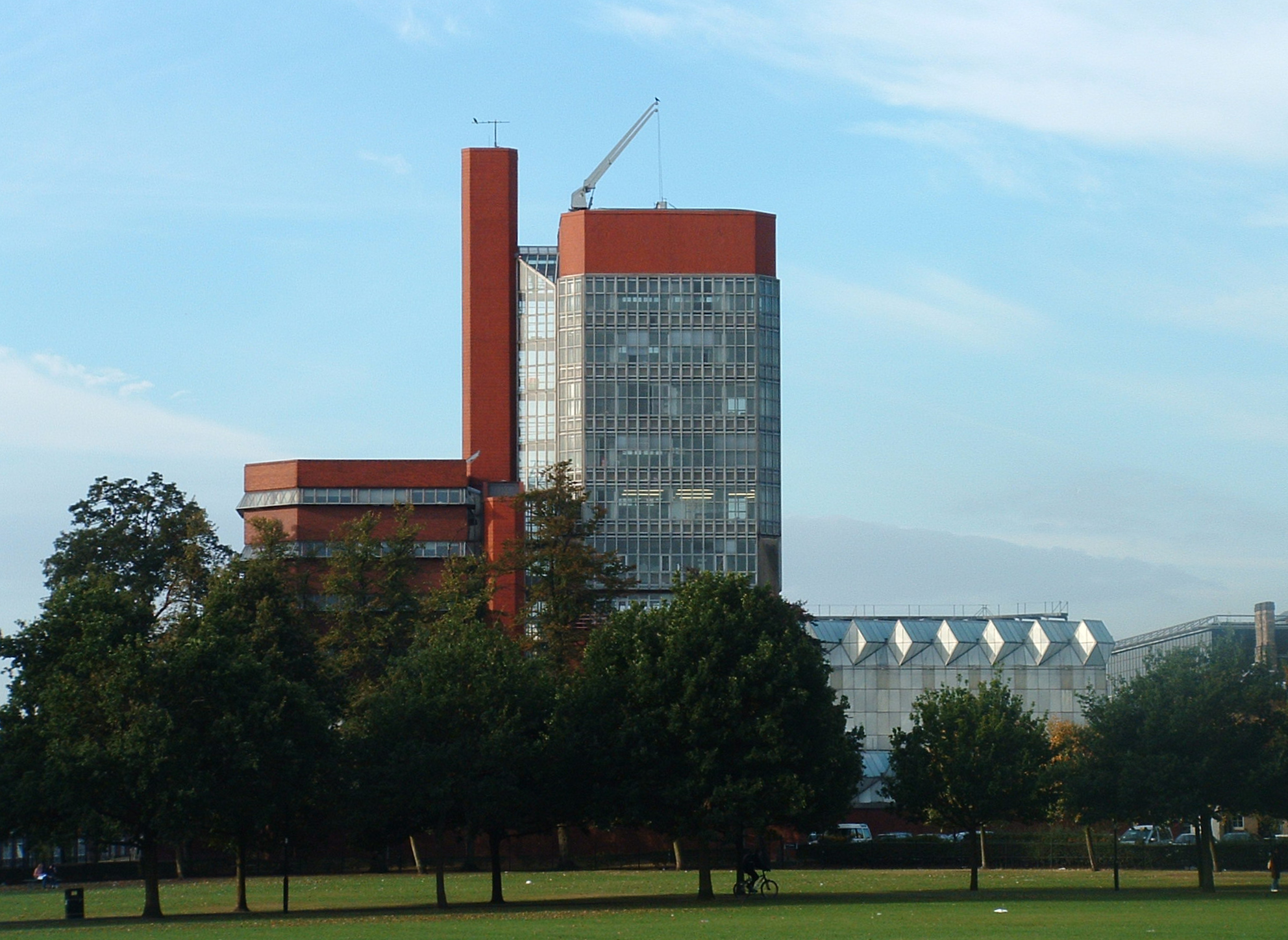
The Leicester University Engineering Building, designed with James Stirling and James Gowan

Newby became a partner of the practice in 1956 and then, following the death of Felix Samuely in 1959, the head of the practice at the age of 32. He had designed the British buildings in the 1958 Brussels Expo '58, and this had helped him establish a reputation for being one of the most creative engineers working at the time. Over the following years he received a number of high-profile appointments. In 1960 he was appointed to design the American Embassy in London with Eero Saarinen, whom he met in the United States, and in 1965 to design a new Aviary for Regent's Park Zoo, with Cedric Price and Lord Snowdon.

The most celebrated of his buildings is the Engineering Building at the University of Leicester, designed with James Stirling and James Gowan.

Newby went on to work with the Chicago based firm of Skidmore, Owings and Merrill to design a new factory for Boots in Nottingham, completed in 1968.

== Other work ==
From 1962 Newby lectured at the Architectural Association

Newby was actively involved in the Institution of Structural Engineers, where he was the convenor of the History Group, which examined the history of structural engineering. He held this post until 2000.

Newby restored and returned a medieval chantry in Wiltshire to its original state, and had the building listed.

== Awards ==
Newby was awarded the Institution of Structural Engineers Gold Medal in 1985.
