= University of Leicester Engineering Building =

University building in the UK

Engineering Building, University of Leicester
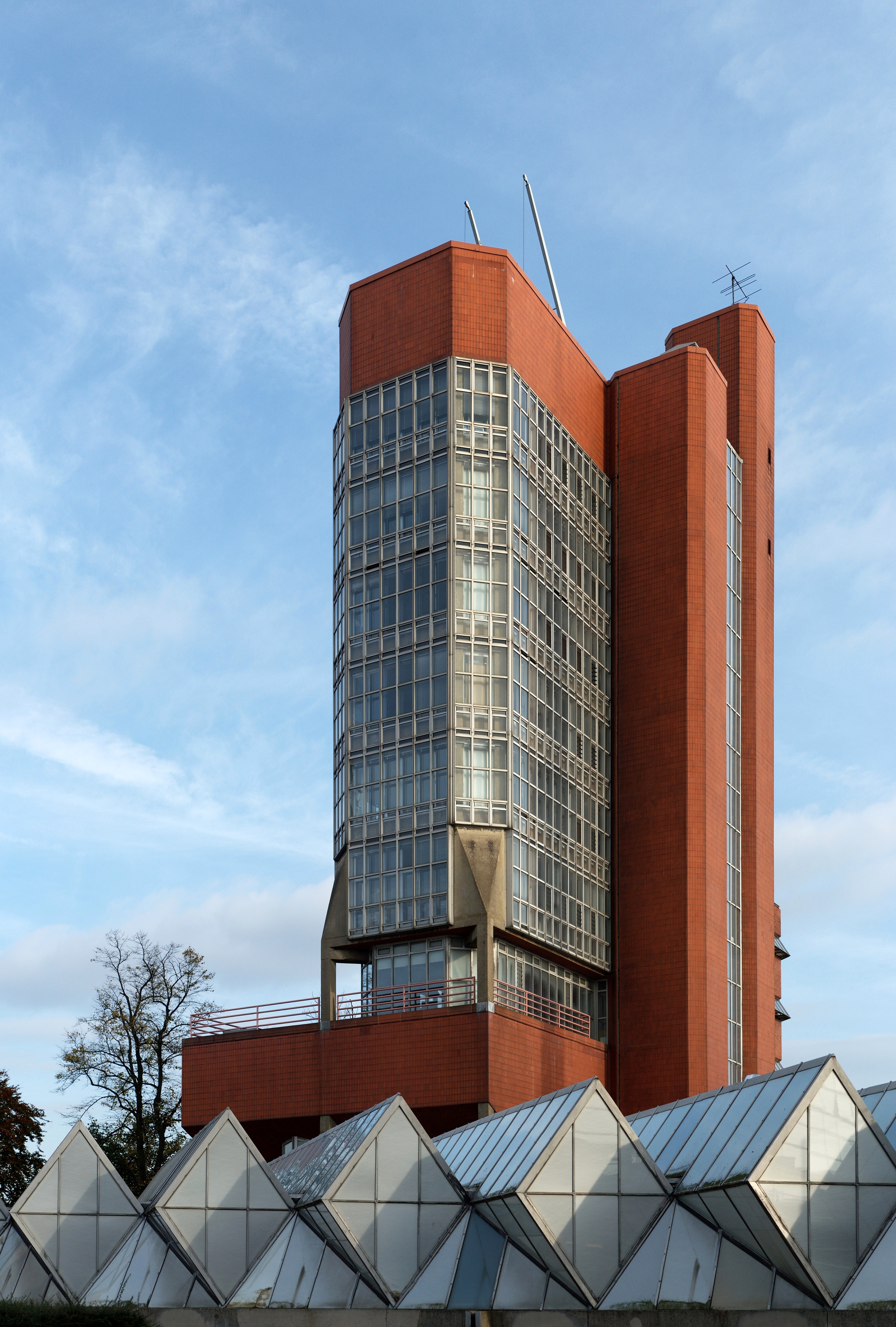
- Engineering Building, October 2009
- Interactive map of the Engineering Building, University of Leicester area
- Alternative names: University of Leicester Engineering Building

General information
- Status: Completed
- Type: Teaching, research
- Architectural style: Brutalism, Postmodernism
- Location: Leicester, United Kingdom, University Road, LE1 7RH
- Coordinates: 52°37′13.19″N 1°7′25.18″W
- Current tenants: University of Leicester
- Construction started: 1959
- Completed: 1963

Design and construction
- Architects: James Stirling, James Gowan
- Structural engineer: Frank Newby

The Engineering Building is part of the University of Leicester. It was designed by the architects James Stirling and James Gowan.

== The Red Trilogy ==
The building is part of the Red Trilogy by James Stirling. Beginning in the late 1950s, the architect designed three university buildings featuring distinctly red materials: red bricks and red tiles. The Red Trilogy includes the Engineering Building, University of Leicester (1959–1963), the Seeley Historical Library, Faculty of History, University of Cambridge (1964–1967), and the Florey Building, Queen's College, Oxford (1966–1971). James Stirling and James Gowan worked together on the design for the Engineering Building. The Trilogy's two later buildings were designed by Stirling, without Gowan.

== Design ==
The Engineering Building is a large and complex structure. Stirling and Gowan were tasked to design spaces for offices, laboratories, auditorium, and workshops with heavy machinery. The design also includes a water tank on top. The workshops are located in the low-rise section of the building, in a hall with a rectangular floor plan. Connected to the workshop hall is the tower, which houses auditorium, offices, and laboratories. The water tank sits on top of the tower. The tower section is notable for its chamfered edges and its prismatic geometry. The auditorium is located at the base of the tower. The auditoriums seating arrangement is designed typically stadium-like with staggered rows of seats. The angled auditorium floor results in a pronounced wedge-shape on the building's exterior. The tower's facades are clad in glass and red tiles, the workshop hall's facade is entirely made of frosted glass.

A unique feature of the workshop hall is its roof construction. The roof's geometry is rotated by 45 degrees in respect to the floor plan's orientation. This results in a unique jagged roof line and a diamond-pattern-like perimeter. The roof appears as a series of multiple translucent prisms. The translucent effect was achieved by lining the glass panes with fibre-glass. Other parts of the glass shell are completely opaque, in contrast. Here, the glass panes were coated with a thin layer of aluminium.

Stirling and Gowan were commissioned in 1957. The design is dated to 1959. Construction lasted from 1960 to 1963. The consulting structural engineer was Frank Newby.

== Refurbishment ==
By 2013 the deterioration of the glazed facades in the Workshop blocks and low rise Block had got to a position that something had to be done; refurbishment of the facade, structure and associated building systems was now essential. Clearly the challenges around a necessary refurbishment were enormous. The building was at risk failing completely without a full fabric replacement, and it was always freezing cold in winter and unbearably hot in summer. The leaky single glazed steel framed glazing was replaced with English Heritage approval with aluminium framed double-glazed units. The internal HVAC systems had to be replaced almost like for like, but clever solutions were realised to turn the heating system (exposed pipe coils and ventilation fan units) into a changeover system with elevated chilled water in summer providing peak lop cooling. Work was undertaken by a large Contractor and Consultant supply chain working with the University of Leicester and English Heritage. The project was commenced in January 2016 and successfully completed by the end of 2017, saving the building's unique architecture for many generations to come.

== Recognition ==
The Red Trilogy in general, and the Engineering Building in particular, are recognized as turning points in the development of postwar modern architecture. James Stirling went beyond the paradigm of pure functionalism. The Engineering Building's color and geometry are more decorative than the typical 1950s and 1960s brutalist architecture. The three buildings of the Red Trilogy were designed consecutively. The Leicester Engineering Building first, the Cambridge History Faculty second, the Oxford Florey Building third. Their successive designs illustrate James Stirling's way towards postmodernist architecture. The designs are progresisvely more playful and decorative. The Engineering Building represents Stirling's first step from brutalism towards postmodernism. Therefore, the building is regarded as one of the origins of postmodern architecture. At the same time, the Engineering Building als is praised as one of Britains high points of brutalist architecture. Elain Harwoods book Space, Hope, and Brutalism features a photo of the Engineering Building's workshop hall on its cover. The building is a protected heritage site with a Grade 2 listing.
