= Michael Wilford =

English architect (1938–2023)

- Born: 9 September 1938; Surbiton, Surrey, England
- Died: 10 March 2023 (aged 84)
- Occupation: Architect
- Awards: Stirling Prize (1997)
- Practice: Stirling/Wilford Partnership (1971–1992); Michael Wilford & Partners (1993–2001); Michael Wilford Architects, UK (2001–2023); Wilford Schupp Architekten, DE (2001–2023)
- Buildings: Lowry Centre

Michael James Wilford CBE (9 September 1938 – 10 March 2023) was an English architect from Hartfield, East Sussex. Wilford studied at the Northern Polytechnic School of Architecture, London, from 1955 to 1962, and at the Regent Street Polytechnic Planning School, London, in 1967. In 1960, he joined the practice of James Stirling and in 1971 together established the Stirling/Wilford partnership. He designed the British Embassy in Berlin.

== Biography ==
Michael James Wilford was born in Surbiton, Surrey on 9 September 1938. In 1960 Wilford joined the practice which James Stirling created in 1956. The Stirling/Wilford partnership was established in 1971 and continued until James Stirling's death in 1992. From 1993 to 2001 Michael Wilford worked in partnership under the name of Michael Wilford and Partners. In England, Michael Wilford practiced under the name of Michael Wilford architects and in Germany had established Wilford Schupp, based in Stuttgart.

Wilford's work has gained international renown and includes significant public buildings such as performing art centres, art galleries, museums and libraries located around the world. These projects have won many architectural awards, the most recent including The Royal Fine Art Commission Building of the Year Award in 2001 for The Lowry performing and visual arts centre in Salford, England.

Wilford taught extensively in schools of architecture including posts at Yale, Harvard, Rice, the University of Cincinnati in USA, the University of Toronto, McGill University Montreal in Canada, University of Newcastle, Australia, the Architectural Association in London, and the University of Sheffield, England. He was a visiting professor at the Liverpool School of Architecture. This was his favorite school of architecture. He had been an external examiner at many UK schools of architecture and sat on juries for numerous international architectural competitions and architectural awards.

Wilford was a member of the Royal Institute of British Architects, the Singapore Institute of Architects, Royal Institute of Arbitrators, Fellow of Royal Society of Arts, and an Honorary Member of the Bund Deutscher Architekten. In 2001 he was made a Commander of the Order of the British Empire.

National Life Stories conducted an oral history interview (C467/88) with Michael Wilford in 2009 for its Architects Lives' collection held by the British Library.

Michael Wilford died on 10 March 2023, at the age of 84.

== Buildings ==
- 2000 The Lowry performing and visual arts centre in Salford, England
- 2000 British Embassy in Berlin
- 1994 Hochschule für Musik und Darstellende Kunst (University for Art and Music), Stuttgart, Germany

== Awards and prizes ==
- 1997 Stirling Prize – Hochschule für Musik und Darstellende Kunst, Stuttgart, Germany

== Gallery ==
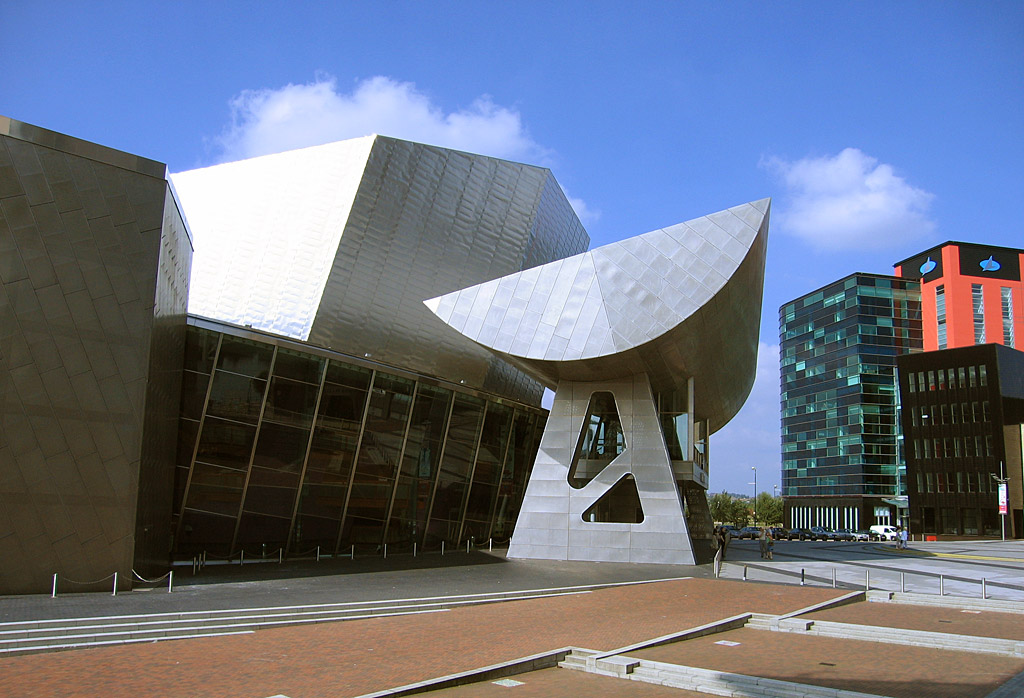
The Lowry performing and visual arts centre, Salford, England

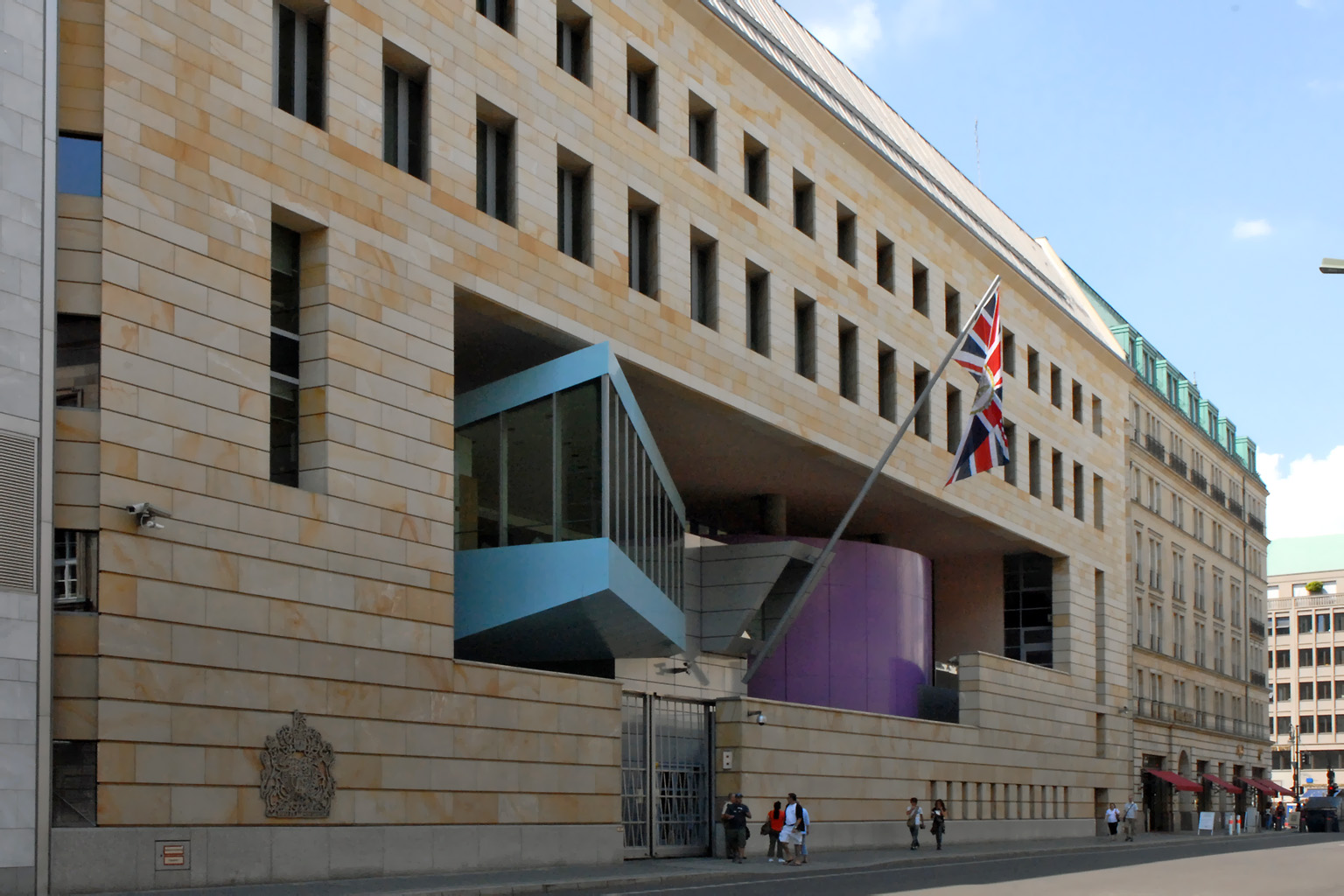
The British Embassy, Berlin.
