= James Gowan =

British architect

- Born: 18 October 1923; Pollokshields, Glasgow, Scotland
- Died: 15 June 2015 (aged 91); London, England
- Education: Glasgow School of Art, Kingston School of Architecture
- Occupation: Architect
- Spouse: Margaret Barry (m. 1944; died 2001)
- Practice: Associated architectural firm[s]
- Buildings: Langham House Close
- Projects: Skylon
- Design: Leicester Engineering Building, Schrieber house, Hampstead

James Gowan (18 October 1923 – 12 June 2015) was a Scottish-born architect known for his post-modernist designs of the "engineering style" which influenced a generation of British architects.

== Life ==
Gowan was born in Pollokshields, Glasgow in 1923. He was brought up by his grandparents in Partick after his parents' separation, but went to live with his mother aged 12 and attended Hyndland Secondary School. He studied architecture at the Glasgow School of Art before joining the Royal Air Force during the Second World War. He was stationed in Palestine as a radar operator. After the war, he moved to London and completed his studies at Kingston School of Architecture. He married Margaret Barry in October 1944, having two daughters.

== Career ==
After graduating Gowan was employed by Philip Powell who had been his tutor at Kingston. His projects included working on the Skylon design for the 1951 Festival of Britain, then Stevenage New Town. Then later while working at Lyons Israel Ellis he met James Stirling with whom he formed a practice in 1956.

=== Gowan and Stirling ===
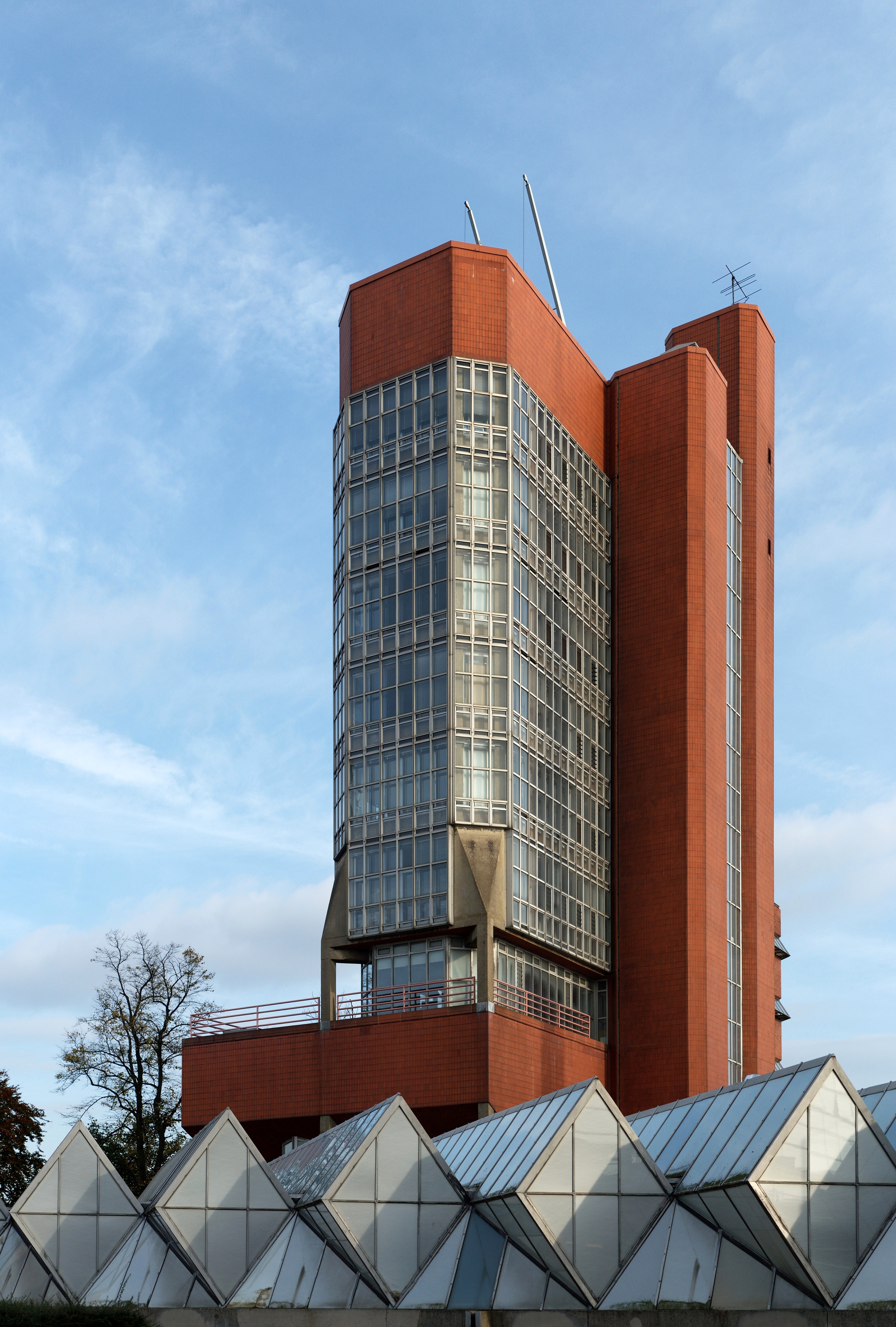
University of Leicester Engineering Building

Gowan and Stirling's initial project was to design Langham House Close on Ham Common, West London, which according to the Guardian "quickly established the pair as one of the most radical practices of their generation".

Gowan said of his work that "We were reacting against the older generation, setting up a critique of what might be done – a reaction against boredom, plainness and the mechanical nature of contemporary rationalism, of social rationalism and dainty well-produced things."

Their most well-known work was on the Le Corbusier-influenced University of Leicester Engineering Building. This building was noted for its technological and geometric character, with glazed towers clad in red tiles evocative of the local Victorian era industrial aesthetic and a crystalline workshop roof consisting of 2,500 diamond-shaped glass panels. The pair split acrimoniously due to fundamental differences of opinion as to the correct approach for their next commission which was the University of Cambridge History Faculty Library, with Gowan believing strongly that reusing aspects of their earlier design did not fit the purposes of the Library building.

=== Solo projects and teaching ===
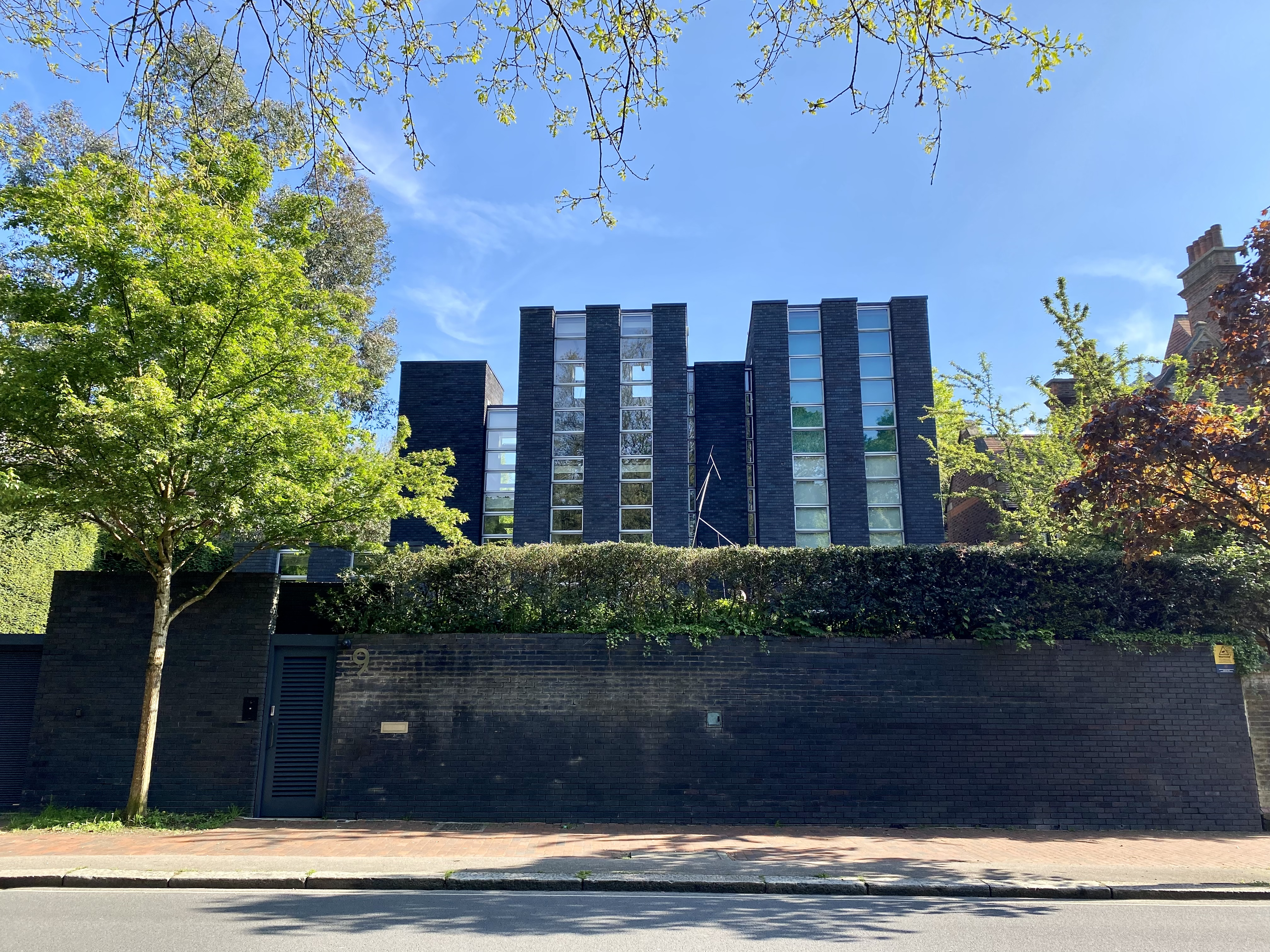
Schreiber House, seen in 2024

Gowan then created designs for projects such as Schreiber House in West Hampstead, built in 1964 for furniture designer Chaim Schreiber, for which Gowan designed bespoke fitted-furniture that Schreiber subsequently made. Almost two decades later, in 1982, Gowan designed a second house for Schreiber, in Chester.

Gowan also worked on large housing schemes in Greenwich and East Hanningfield. Later in the 1990s, he began to work on a series of Italian hospitals and care homes, notably the Istituto Clinico Humanitas near Milan., Clinica Humanitas Gavazzeni in Bergamo, Techint offices in Milan, all in association with the Italian Architect Renato Restelli.

Gowan did not receive the personal recognition to match the boldness of his designs and his contribution to the work with Stirling was unfairly understated. His career after the split did not reach the heights of his partner's, but he was recognised as a very influential teacher at the Architectural Association School of Architecture, Heriot-Watt University, and the Royal College of Art. His mentoring can be seen to have borne fruit in the work of Richard Rogers, Peter Cook, Quinlan Terry amongst others. He was appointed Bannister Fletcher Professor at University College London in 1975 and also taught in the US as visiting professor.

National Life Stories conducted an oral history interview (C467/101) with James Gowan in 2012-13 for its Architects Lives' collection held by the British Library.
