= Langham House Close =

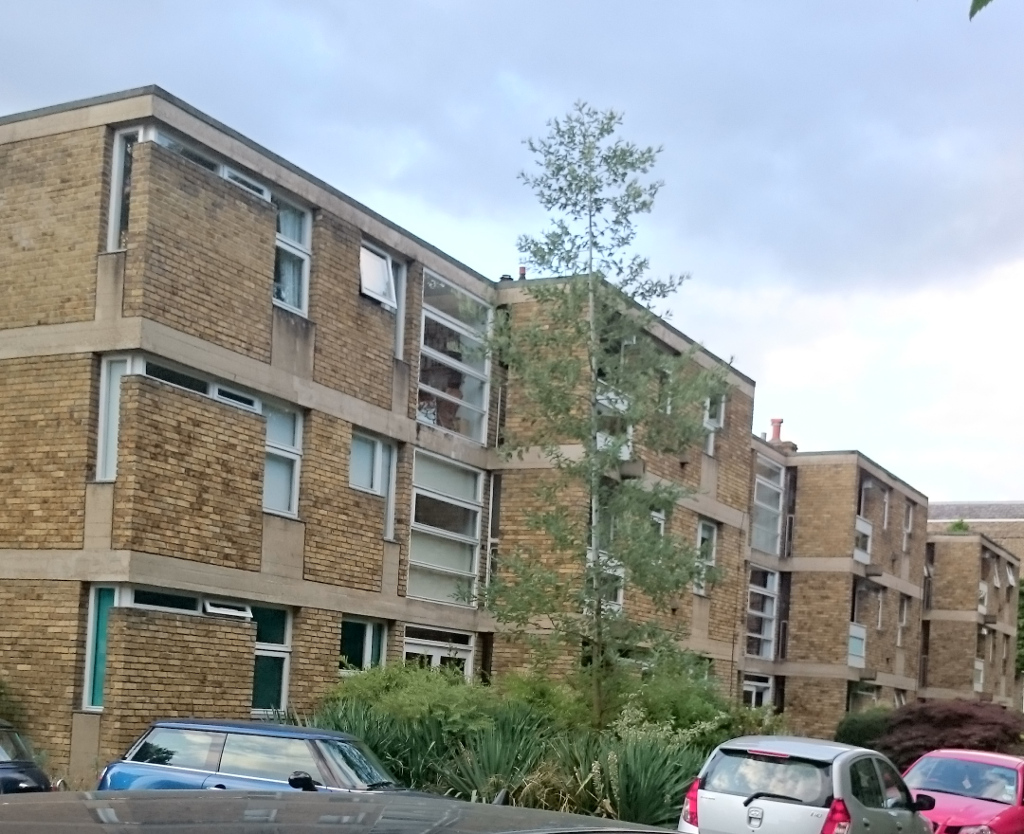
- Langham House Close – main block from west pavilion

- Location within London Borough of Richmond upon Thames
- Etymology: Langham House

General information
- Status: Completed
- Type: flats
- Architectural style: brutalising postmodern
- Location: Ham Common, London, TW10 7JE, England
- Coordinates: 51°25′59.57″N 0°18′35.13″W
- Construction started: 1957
- Completed: 1958

Height
- Roof: flat

Technical details
- Material: stock brick and concrete
- Floor count: 2 & 3

Design and construction
- Architects: Stirling & Gowan
- Developer: L Manousso
- Designations: Grade II*

Other information
- Number of units: 30

Listed Building – Grade II*
- Official name: 1–18 Langham House Close; 19–24 Langham House Close; 25–30 Langham House Close
- Designated: 22–23 December 1998
- Reference no.: 1033380;1033381; 1051027

Langham House Close on Ham Common in Ham in the London Borough of Richmond upon Thames is a development of three Grade II* listed buildings designed in 1955 by the British architects James Gowan and James Stirling. The Le Corbusier-influenced buildings were the architects' first major project working together and cemented their reputation as leaders amongst the Brutalist movement. The development was constructed during 1957–58 for Manousso Group.

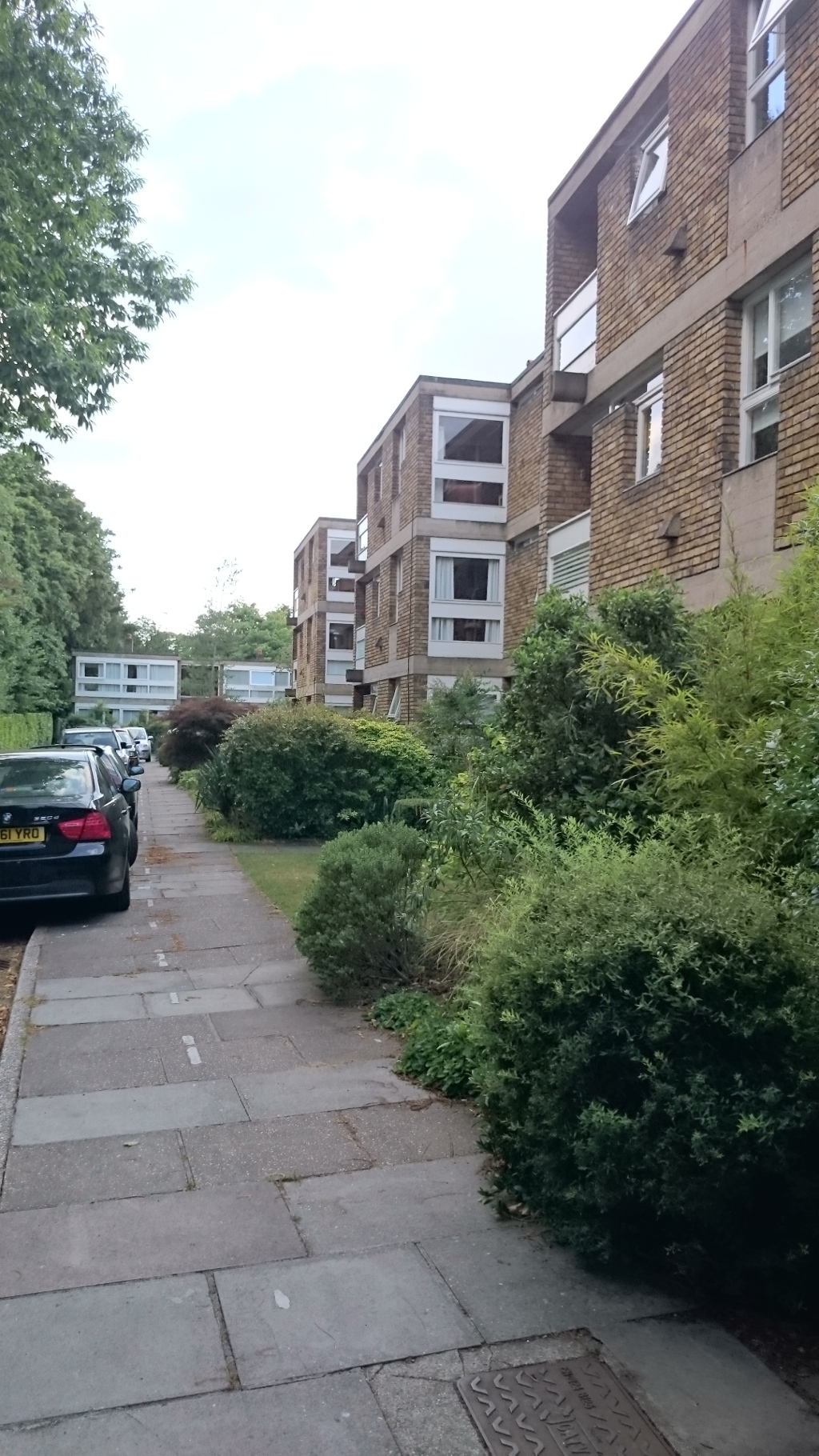
Main block and west pavilion

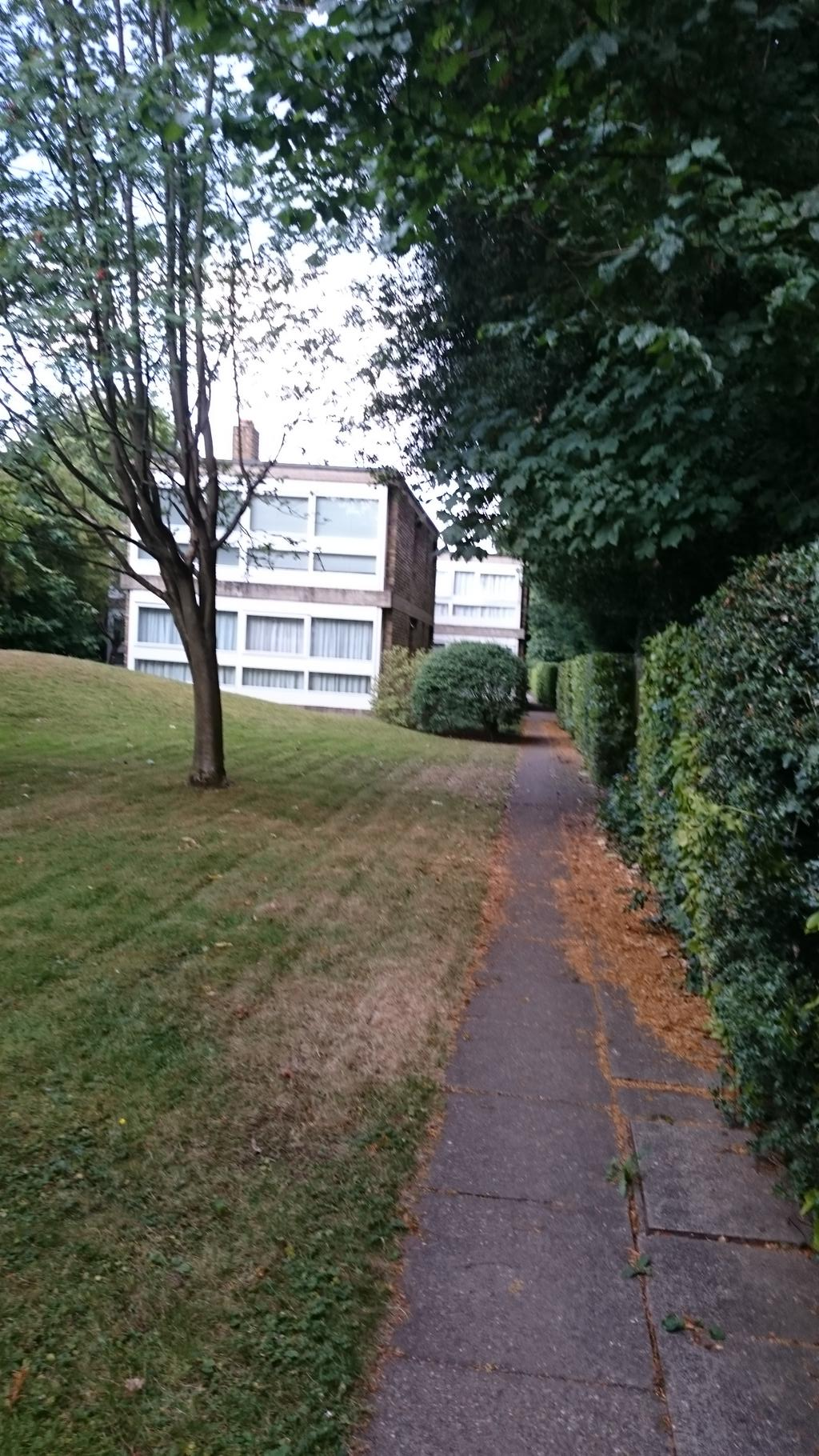
East pavilion

== Location ==
Langham House Close is a cul-de-sac off Ham Street, Ham Common, London located to the north of the Cassel Hospital and behind Langham House, both Grade II listed. After the death of former owner, Sir Lyonel Tollemache, in 1953 the house and garden were sold separately, Langham House was converted from a single dwelling into flats and the garden plot was sold for development on a 999-year lease in 1955.

== Inception ==
Langham House Close was the inaugural built design project of the partnership of Gowan and Stirling in 1955. The partnership were engaged by developer Luke Manousso, the father of one of Stirling's former students. Nikolaus Pevsner writes that it was "a landmark in the emerging style of the late 1950s in England, in reaction against all-glass facades and thin, precise detailing".

== Description ==
The development comprises three flat-roofed blocks, one three-storey block of 18 flats designed by Stirling and two, two-storey blocks of six flats designed by Gowan, the two architects following common themes yet expressing individual features. Constructed of second-hand stock brick reflecting the construction of old Langham House, the buildings use in-situ shuttered concrete, blatantly exposed on exterior and repeated in interior surfaces.

Stirling's large block lies nearest Langham House with three communal stairwells providing access to six flats each. Gowan's "garden pavilion" blocks lie further away from Ham Common. The pair are mirror images of each other and provide access to each of the six flats from a central stairwell.

The flats themselves share common features. Each has a central fireplace with back boiler and linen cupboard set in exposed stock brick with concrete lintels and shelves repeating the exterior surface themes on a smaller scale. There are four different designs for the fireplaces though, two in the main block and two in the pavilions which adds variety between each flat. This central unit separates the main living space from the kitchen. The flats vary in number of bedrooms, from one to three adding further variety. Detailed attention has been given to the size and location of windows, a further variable feature.

The design was in radical contrast to other similar developments of its day. In 1966 architectural critic Ian Nairn described the development as

the first building in a new tough style which was as much a reaction against well-meaning vacuity as the Angry plays and novels. The fierce but not overbearing yellow brick and exposed concrete still make their protest straight.

Langham House Close was listed Grade II in 1998 and reclassified Grade II* in 2006 following pressure from the Twentieth Century Society.

== See also ==
- List of Brutalist structures
