= Neue Staatsgalerie =

Art museum in Stuttgart, Germany

Coordinates: 48°46′49″N 9°11′13″E

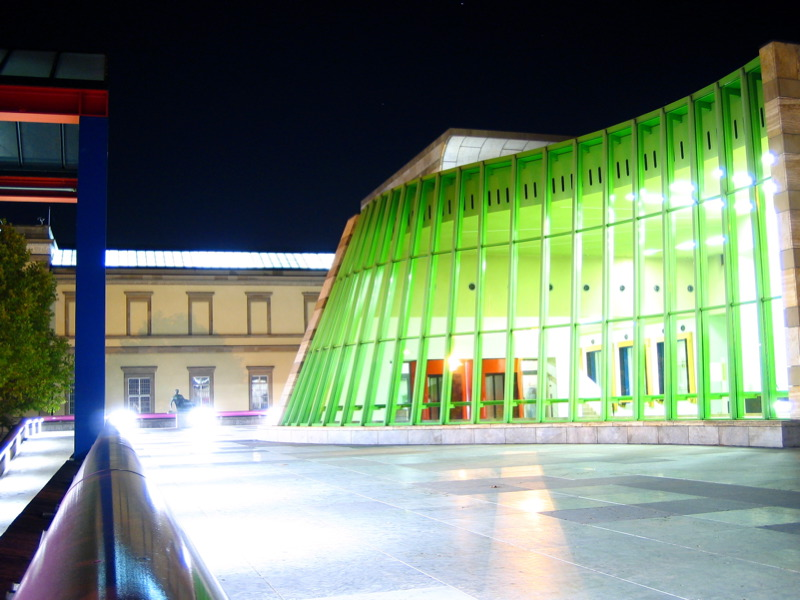
Undulating main façade

Neue Staatsgalerie, Stuttgart, Baden-Württemberg

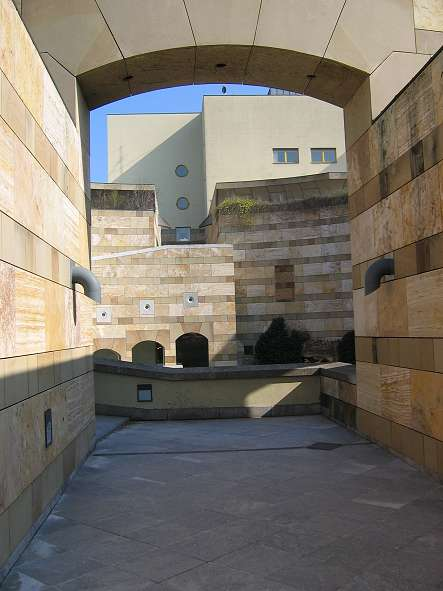
Pedestrian route through the external rotunda

The Neue Staatsgalerie in Stuttgart, Germany, was designed by the British firm James Stirling, Michael Wilford and Associates, although largely accredited solely to partner James Stirling. It was constructed between 1979 and 1984. The building has been claimed as the epitome of Post-modernism.

== Description ==
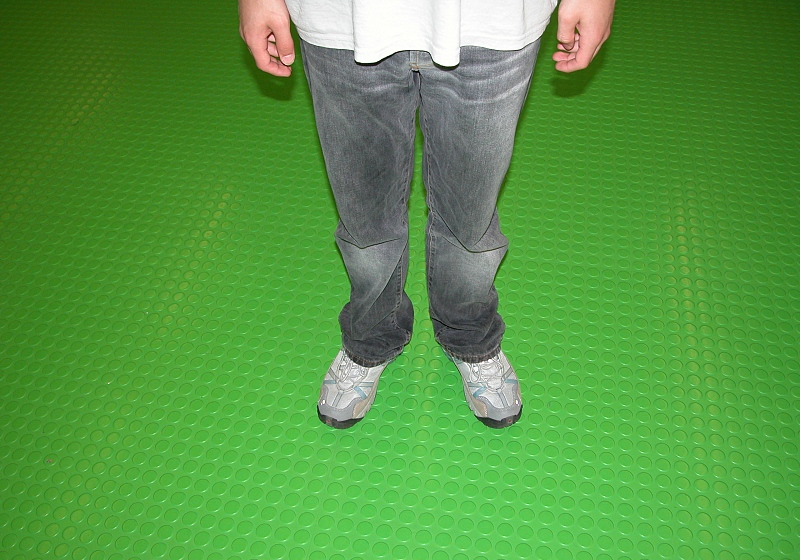
Distinctive rubber flooring in the foyer

The new gallery occupies a site next to the old Staatsgalerie. A car park is located below the building. The building incorporates warm, natural elements of travertine and sandstone in classical forms, to contrast with the industrial pieces of green steel framing system and the bright pink and blue steel handrails. The architect intended to unite the monumental with the informal.

The building's most prominent feature is a central open-top rotunda. This outdoor, enclosed space houses the sculpture garden. It is circumnavigated by a public footpath and ramp that leads pedestrians through the site. This feature allows the public to reach the higher elevation behind the museum from the lower front of the building's main face.

== History ==
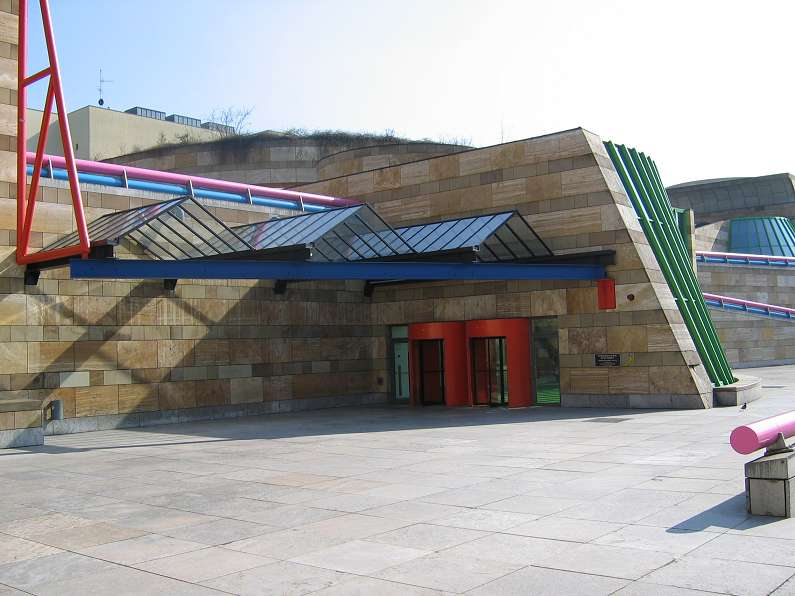
Main entrance

The Neue Staatsgalerie was designed after Stirling and Wilford won a limited entry competition in 1977. It was constructed between 1979 and 1984. Located next-door to Stuttgart's Alte Staatsgalerie, the design echoed the neoclassical design of the older building. Elements also alluded to Stirling's earlier, unbuilt designs, as well as making reference to the Altes Museum in Berlin, the Guggenheim Museum in New York and the Pantheon in Rome.

By uniting Modernist elements with overt Classicism, architectural critic Charles Jencks claims the gallery "epitomized the first stage of Post-Modernism in much the way the Villa Savoye and Barcelona Pavilion summarized early Modernism".

== See also ==
- World Architecture Survey
