= Florey Building =

Student accommodation in Oxford, England

Coordinates: 51°45′04″N 1°15′07″W

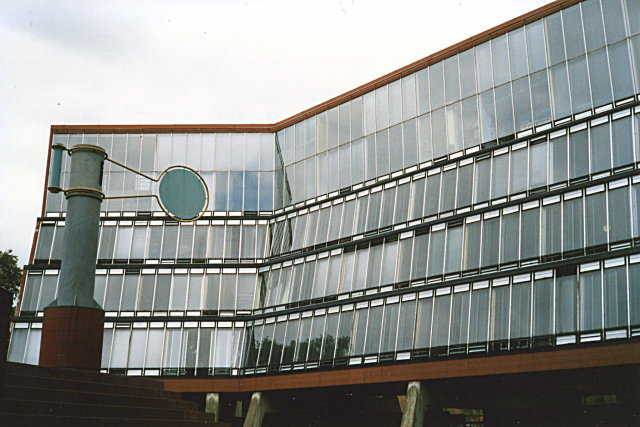
The Florey Building

The Florey Building is a modernist student accommodation building by James Stirling in Oxford, United Kingdom. It is the third and last building of “The Red Trilogy” (together with the Leicester Engineering Faculty building and the Cambridge History Faculty building), all of which are now listed.

== History ==
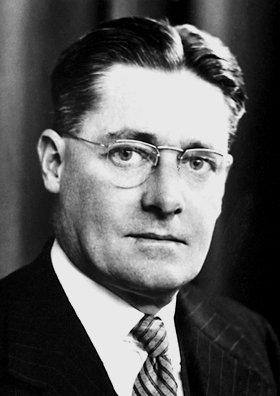
Lord Florey

The building was commissioned for The Queen's College by the then Provost of the college, Sir Howard Florey—later Lord Florey of Adelaide—who shared the 1945 Nobel Prize in Medicine for synthesising the drug penicillin for use, saving hundreds of thousands of lives in the aftermath of WWII. The Florey Building was named after the Provost, following his death during the week that building work commenced on site, in 1968.

Florey sat on the committee in charge of choosing an architect for the project and became a leading advocate of Stirling's selection, despite Stirling not being popular with some of the college's Governing Body. Florey and his supporters argued that the college needed "the best building by the best architect to attract the best students and also research funding", one that he said he did not want to be "boxy and dull but admired by architects."

Construction took place between 1968 and 1971. The completion date was almost a year and a half later than promised due to a delay of the construction drawings to the contractors on site. The building was the third in Stirling's "Red Trilogy", and follows the earlier two in employing the same traditional red industrial bricks and tiles and non-bespoke factory-made glazing systems, as well as sculptural and unusual forms in the overall design.

The buildings in the Red Trilogy were designed in reaction to austere and rectilinear post-war architecture.

== Design ==
The main structure consists of 11 reinforced concrete frames of irregular A shape placed at 7 m spacings linked by spine beams at each floor. Red ceramic tiles clad the main structure and paving for the courtyard. Stirling's design was heavily influenced by the Bauhaus movement and uses bold and sculptural forms which make clear each part of the building's function.

The building is set back from the road and designed in a horse shoe shape, with the open side facing north. All residential rooms feature floor-to-ceiling glazing, facing the inner court of the building. Only a few small windows face outward and are visible from the outside. This gives every room a view across the River Cherwell to the Angel and Greyhound Meadow beyond.

There are 74 single rooms split over four levels, with a top level of double-height gallery rooms for graduates and one apartment for a Bachelor fellow. However, in recent years the building has been used exclusively to accommodate first year undergraduates, with a caretaker occupying the fellow's apartment.

In addition to the bedrooms there is a common room and a dining hall with an associated kitchen.

Heating to the rooms is provided by electric underfloor heating. Stirling initially recommended double glazing which would have significantly lowered energy consumption due to the vast amount of glass. The idea was rejected by the college on the grounds of cost but the rooms have since been retrofitted with double glazing to improve energy efficiency.

The building was originally designed to be approached from the open side of the horse shoe, via a riverside walk and public path connecting to the Magdalen Bridge. This access route was never completed, however evidence of it can still be seen from the river. Access to the building is instead provided by what was intended to be the back entrance through a small car park, which links to St Clements.

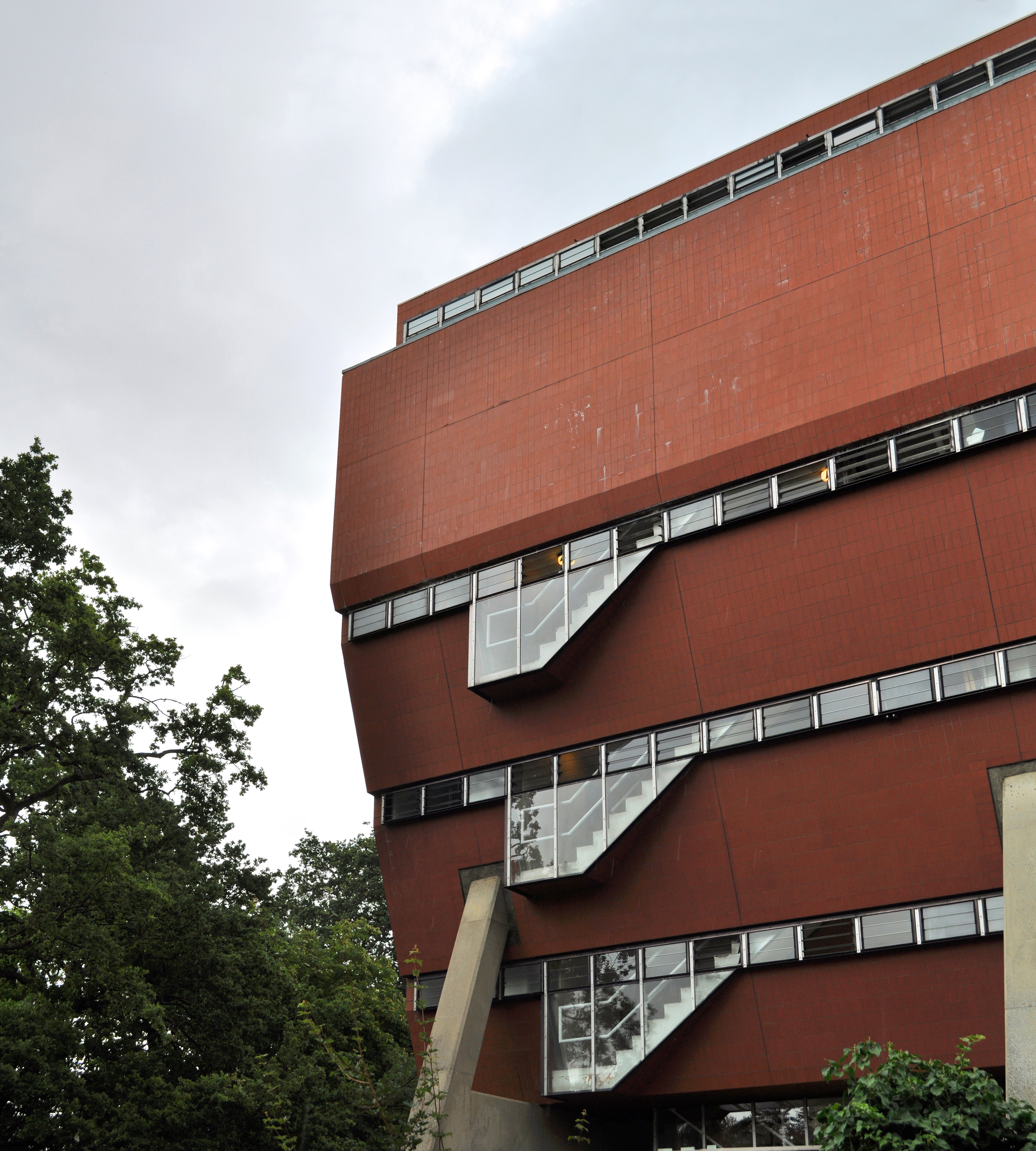
The exterior as seen from St Clement's

== Critical reception and controversy ==
In the book Modern Movements in Architecture, Charles Jencks writes of Stirling's university buildings and praises him as "the best architect of his generation". However, there were numerous problems in the process of constructing the building and Stirling's relationship with the college's governing body was strained. Stirling's office was eventually sued by the Queen's College because of problems encountered both during construction and after completion. As a result, Stirling's office was unable to find work in England for at least a decade after the Florey Building, instead finding promise of work in places including Germany, Japan and the United States.

The buildings themselves were seen as ugly and reactionary by many. In both Oxford and Cambridge, where the architectural vernacular involves the use of stone and other traditional materials, people rejected them even before they were occupied, with angry letters of complaint in the press. In industrial Leicester the engineering faculty was much less controversial. The buildings were among the first examples of architecture to attract popular criticism in the way that modernist painting, music and literature had earlier in the 20th century.

Particular criticism has been made of the Florey Building because of its unattractiveness on the approach from St Clements, which was originally intended as the back entrance to the building. Though disliked by some members of the public, the building has been enjoyed by its student occupants who have praised the sociability of its design.

Stirling's work has more recently been recognised for its contribution to post-war British architecture and his buildings are admired by architects and architectural students. The Royal Institute of British Architects named their annual RIBA Stirling Prize in his honour in 1996, considered to be the most prestigious architecture award in the United Kingdom. Though privately owned, the Florey Building is frequently visited by architects from around the world.

== Statutory listing, current status ==
In 1999 the building was first proposed for statutory protection from damaging alterations by listing as a building of special architectural and historic interest by the PostWar Steering Group of English Heritage. For reasons that are unclear their recommendation was not adopted. A decade later, the Florey Building was listed at Grade II in 2009. An application for it to be upgraded, made by the C20 Society, was resisted by The Queen's College, who employed consultants to argue that the lower Grade II was appropriate. However, the building was re-designated at Grade II* in December 2018.

The college successfully sought planning permission to complete refurbishment work and add an annexe. These plans received criticism by local residents and architects for making significant changes to Stirling's original design. As of February 2019, the college had not implemented the planned work and the future of the building was uncertain.

The building freehold is still owned by The Queen's College, but since the academic year 2018–19 the Florey Building lay unoccupied and boarded up. The college announced in 2024 that it had decided to 'mothball the Florey Building for the foreseeable future'.
