= Seeley Historical Library =

History library of the University of Cambridge

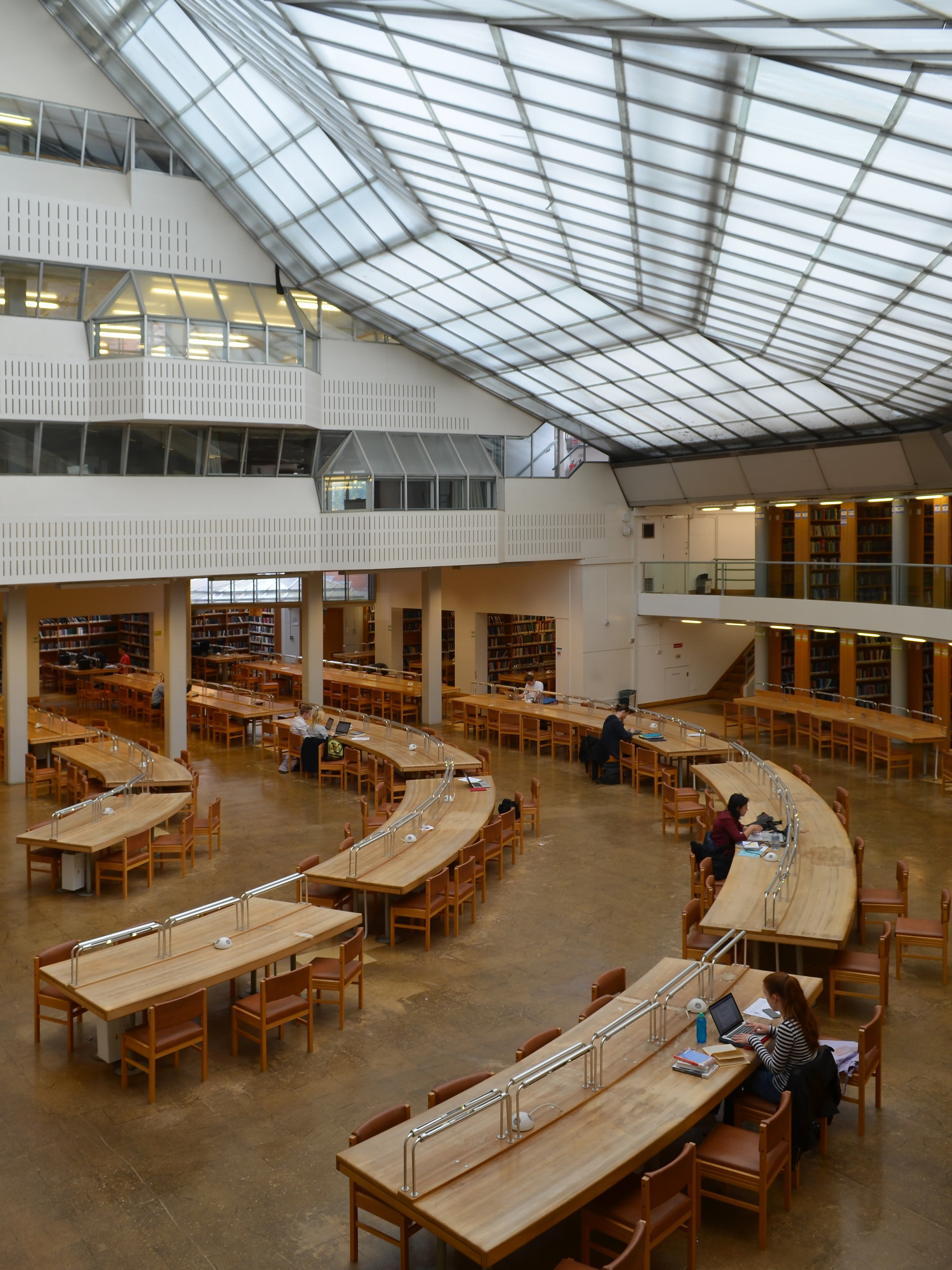
- Seeley Library interior
- 52.201792°N 0.108619°E
- Location: Cambridge, England
- Type: Academic library

Other information
- Affiliation: University of Cambridge
- Website: www.hist.cam.ac.uk/seeley-library

The Seeley Historical Library was originally established as the history library of the University of Cambridge, England. It now holds collections for history, land economy, Latin American studies, politics and international studies and sociology. It is housed within the History Faculty building on the Sidgwick Site off West Road, Cambridge. Since October 2003, incoming books have been classified according to the Library of Congress scheme; before that a unique system was used.

== History ==
The history library was established in 1807 with a collection of a thousand books donated by the will of John Symonds, professor of modern history. After some years of neglect, the library again became a priority in 1884, on the behest of Oscar Browning. It was moved from the gallery of the Philosophical Library to King's College in 1890.

In 1895 a memorial fund was raised to commemorate historian Sir John Seeley's services to the British Empire and to the University; the greater part of this fund was devoted to the endowment of the library, which was named in his honour in 1897.

In 1912 the collection relocated to the top floor of the Arts School, Bene't Street, then in 1935 to the Old Schools. In 1968 the Seeley moved to the Sidgwick site as part of the new History Faculty building designed by James Stirling.

Today the library accommodates over 300 students and houses more than 95,000 volumes. The skylight over the reading room is a crucial part of the design, although it is difficult to see from outside the building and contributes nothing to its silhouette.

Although the building was admired by students of architecture it is less well regarded by those who have to work in it. A 1968 review noted that environmental controls might be difficult to operate by humanities-oriented occupants. Expensive modifications were necessary to render it usable, and in 1984 the university came close to pulling the whole building down. The remodelling of Stirling's attempt to create an environmentally sustainable structure was announced in 2004. The project was headed by John McAslan, who said that "The main problem with the building is that it leaks, it's too bright, too hot in summer and too cold in winter."

Drainage problems and leaks have persisted in the Seeley Library, and a further attempt to remedy the issue was made in the Summer of 2015, when an entirely new surface was given to the flat concrete roof over the book stacks.

The building is to undergo extensive refurbishment and extension in 2025, with the library being temporarily moved to the University Library to enable works.

== Campaign to rename the library ==
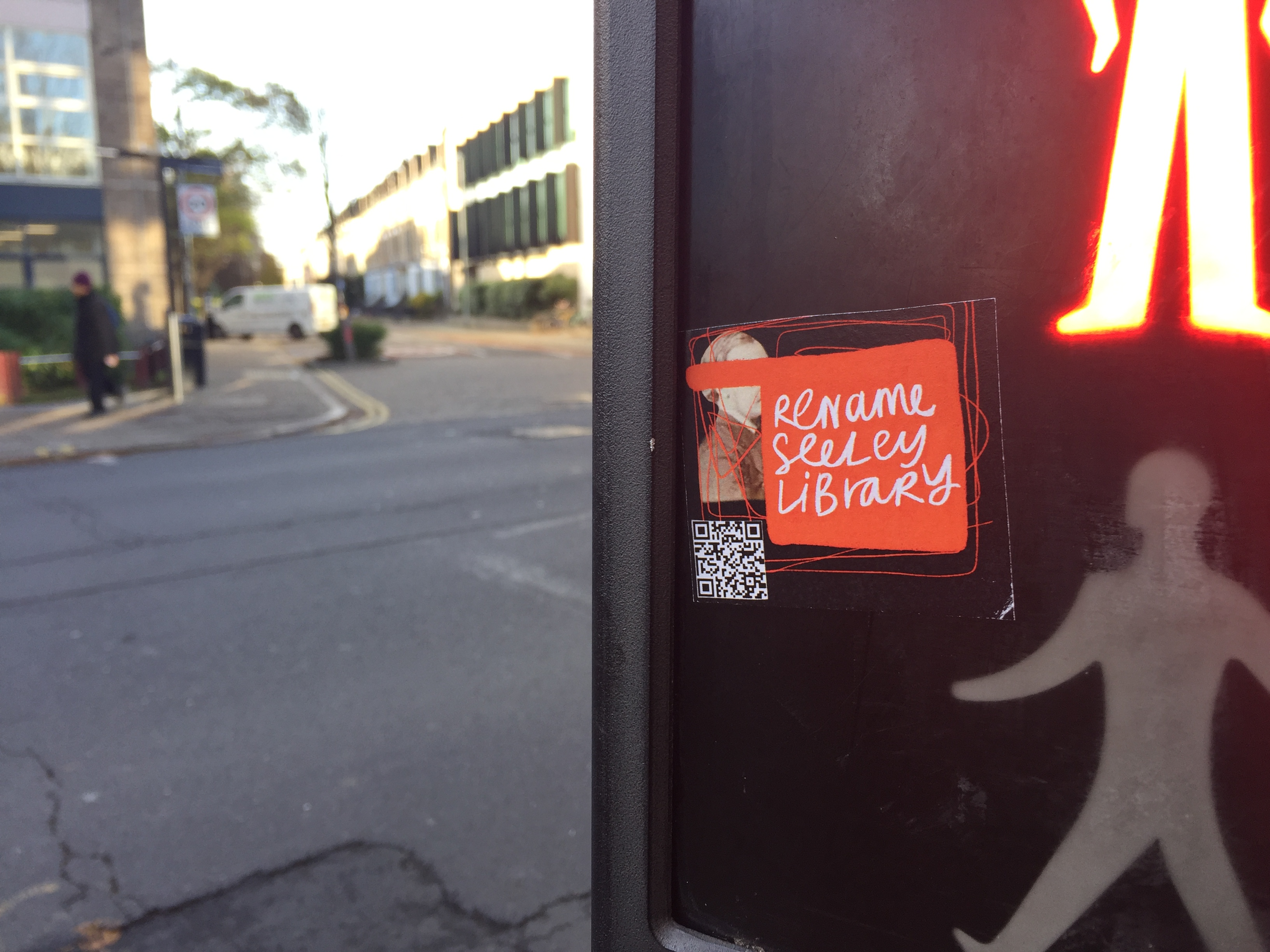
A "Rename Seeley Library" sticker on a road crossing sign, opposite Bateman Street, in Cambridge

In November 2021, a petition calling on the University of Cambridge to change the name of the library to the History Faculty Library attracted more than 600 signatures. 28 university societies and organisations have backed the petition, including the Student Union, which is calling on the university's history department to rename the Seeley Historical Library because its current name celebrates John Robert Seeley, a Cambridge historian "known for his justification of the British Empire". At Christ's College where Seeley studied and was a tutor, the former "Seeley History Society" has been renamed "Christ's College History Society".

== Gallery ==
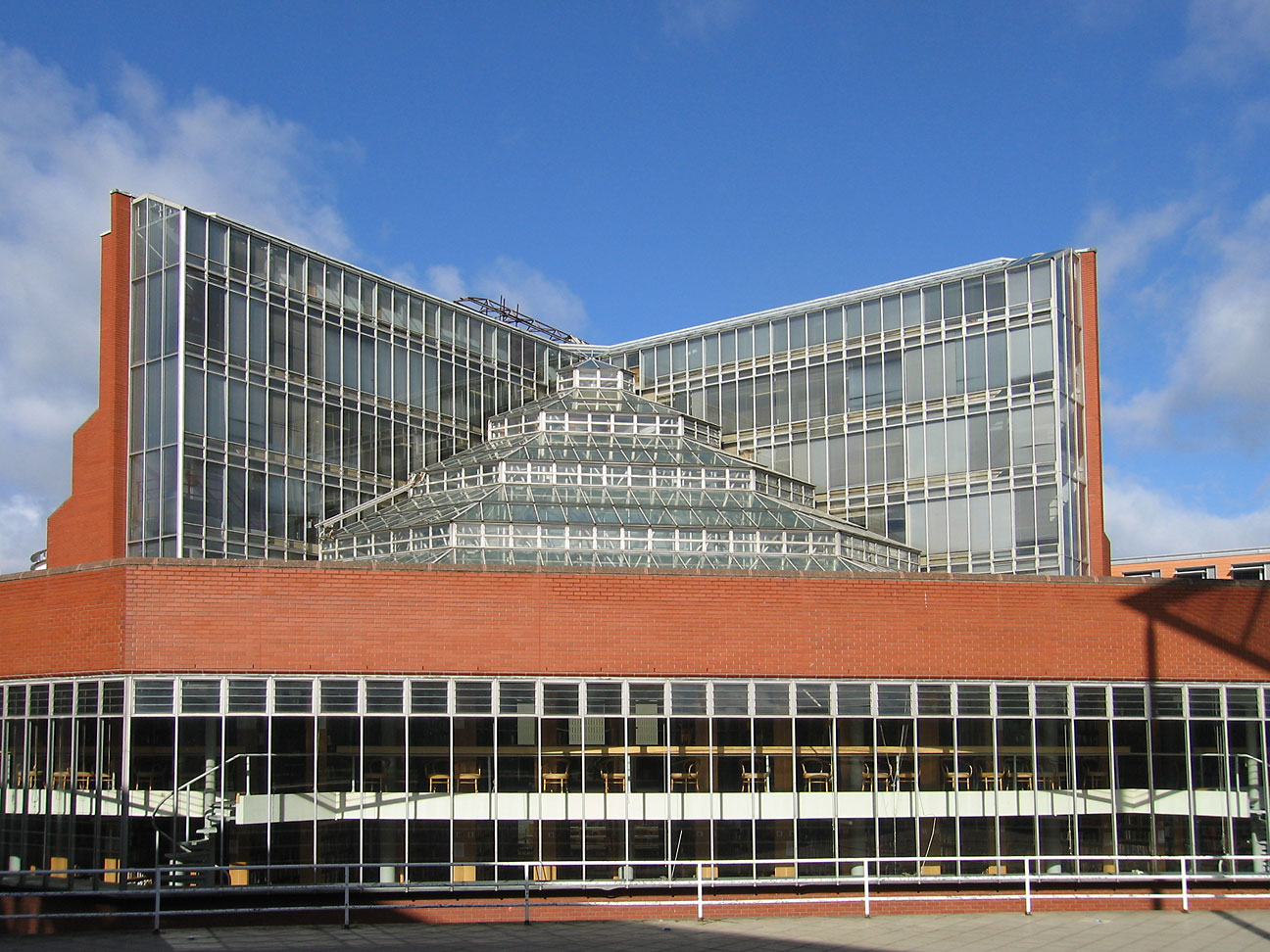
Seeley Library from the southeast

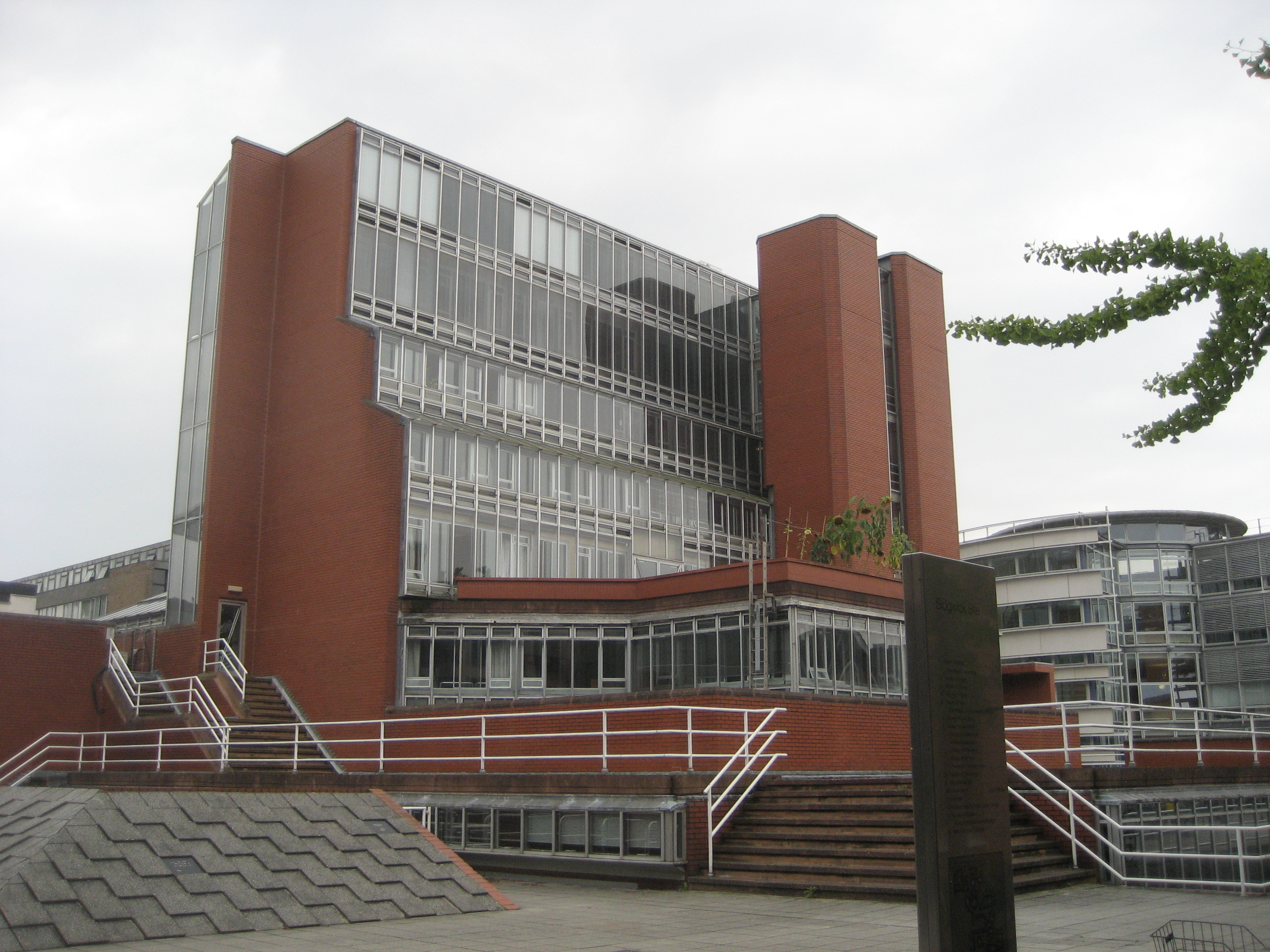
Seeley Library from the northeast

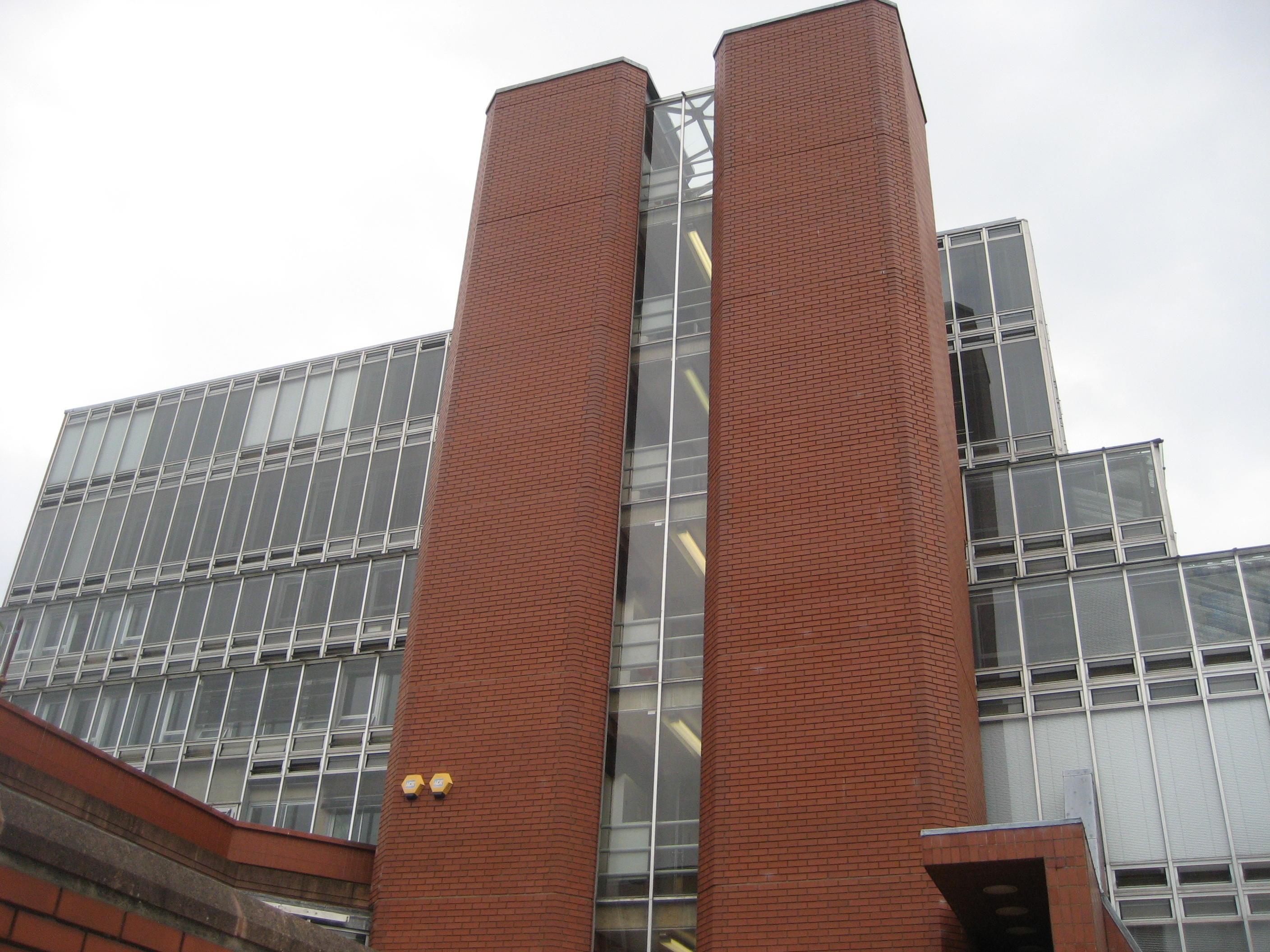
Seeley Library from the north
