= James Stirling (architect) =

British architect (1924–1992)

Sir James Stirling RA
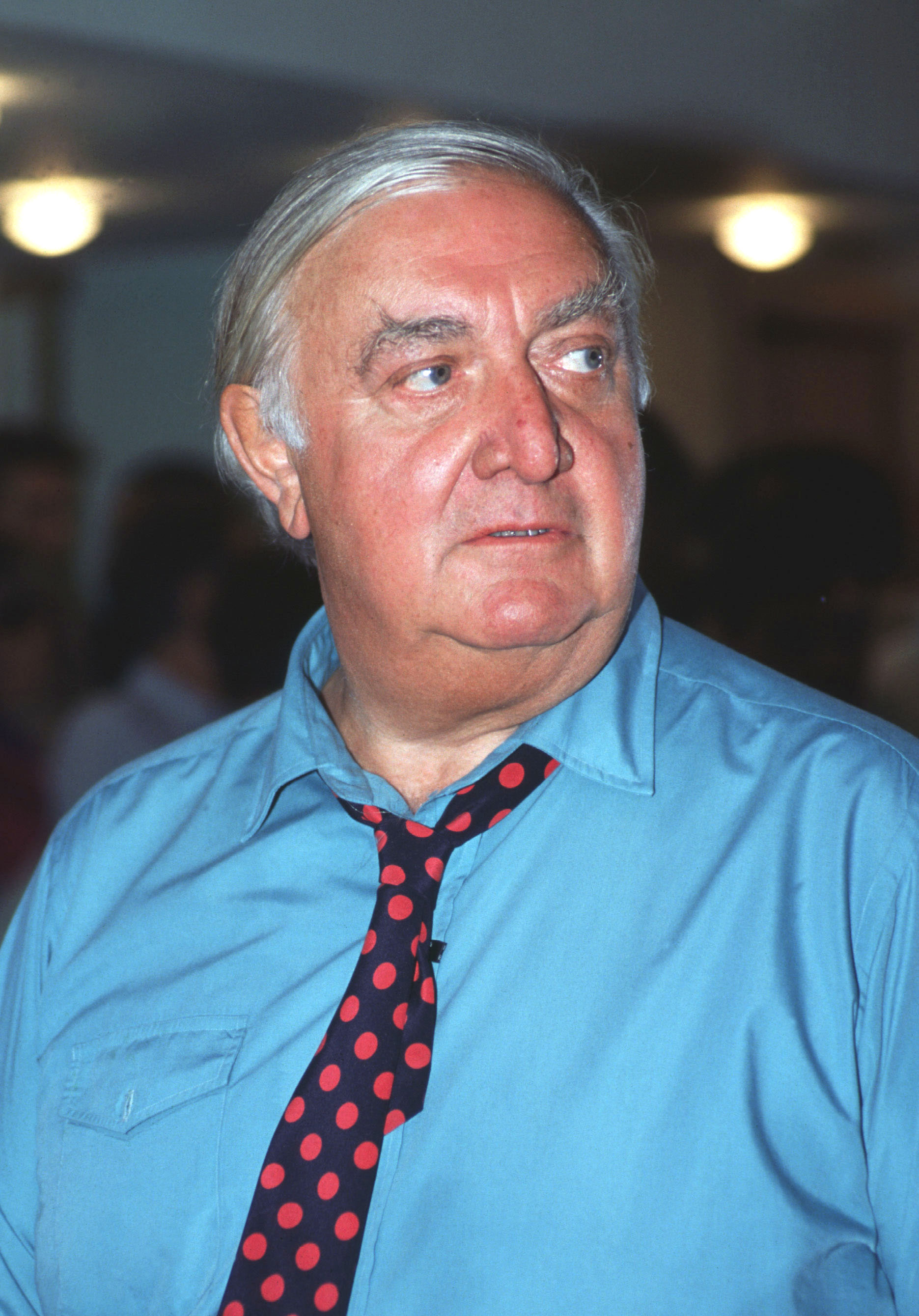
- Stirling in 1991
- Born: 22 April 1924; Glasgow, Scotland
- Died: 25 June 1992 (aged 68); London, England
- Occupation: Architect
- Awards: Alvar Aalto Medal (1977); RIBA Royal Gold Medal (1980); Pritzker Prize (1981); Praemium Imperiale (1990); Knight Bachelor (1992)
- Buildings: Andrew Melville Hall, St Andrews (1960); Engineering Building, Leicester (1963); History Faculty Library, Cambridge, UK (1967); Neue Staatsgalerie, Stuttgart (1983); Clore Gallery, London (1987); No 1 Poultry, London (1997, posthumous completion by firm)

Sir James Frazer Stirling RA (22 April 1924 – 25 June 1992) was a British architect.

Stirling worked in partnership with James Gowan from 1956 to 1963, then with Michael Wilford from 1971 until 1992.

== Early life and education ==
Stirling was born in Glasgow. His year of birth is widely quoted as 1926 but his longstanding friend Sir Sandy Wilson later stated it was 1924. The family moved to Liverpool when James was an infant, where he attended Quarry Bank High School. After leaving school, he studied at the School of Art in Liverpool between 1940-41, while working in an architect's office. During World War II, he joined the Black Watch before transferring to the Parachute Regiment. He was parachuted behind German enemy lines before D-Day and was wounded twice, before returning to Britain.

Stirling studied architecture from 1945 until 1950 at the University of Liverpool, where Colin Rowe was a tutor. He worked in a number of firms in London before establishing his own practice. From 1952 to 1956 he worked with Lyons, Israel, Ellis in London where he met his first partner James Gowan. Lyons, Israel, Ellis was considered one of the most influential post war practices at that time, focusing on buildings for the Welfare State with architects such as Alan Colquhoun and John Miller, Neave Brown, Sue Martin, Richard MacCormac all of whom went on to architectural prominence. Stirling worked on a number of school buildings including Peckham Girl's Comprehensive School. When he and James Gowan started their own practice Lyons Israel Ellis gave them part of their Preston housing project, helping to establish their reputation for innovative design.

== Career ==
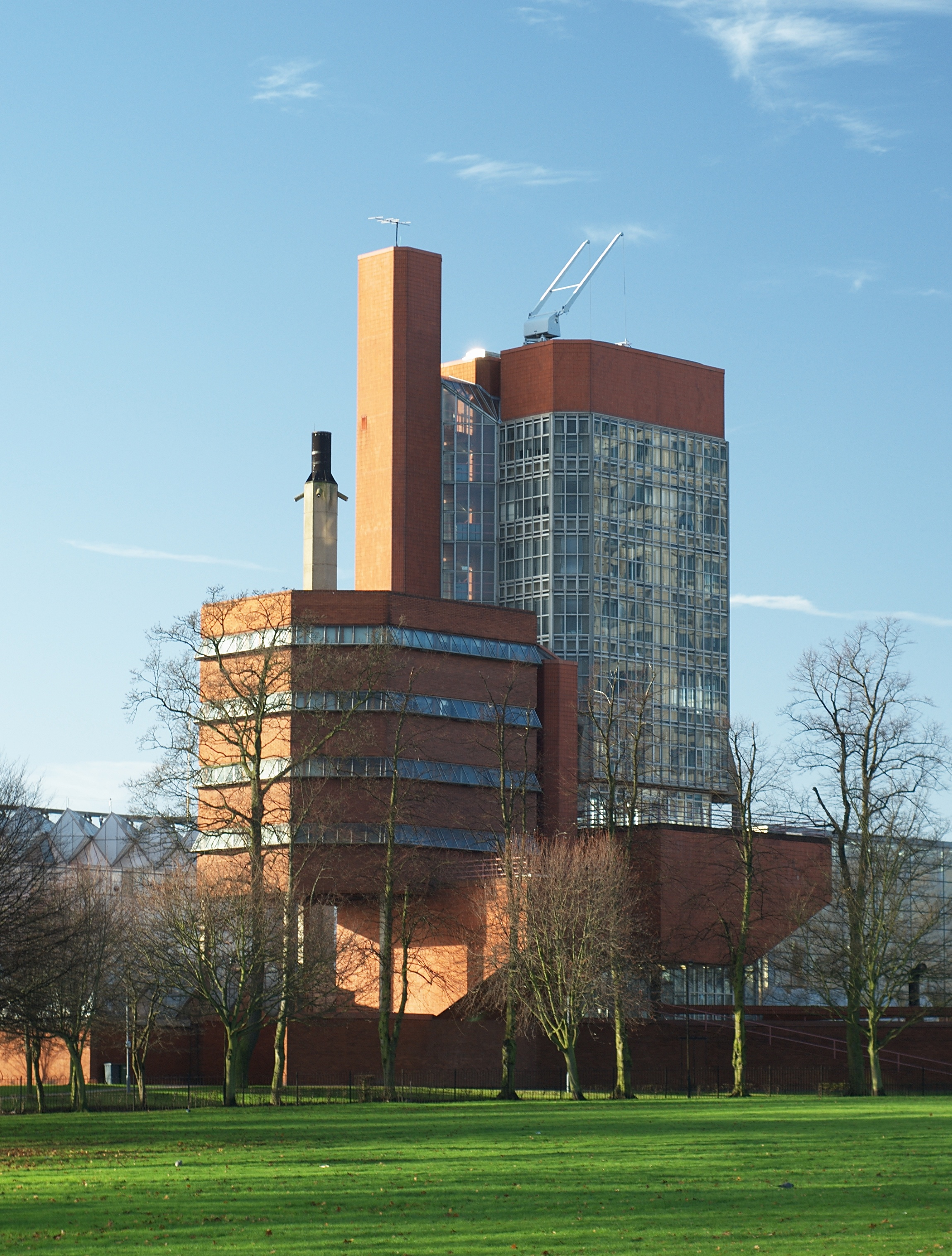
University of Leicester Engineering Building (1959–63, Grade II* listed)

In 1956 he and James Gowan left their positions as assistants with the firm of Lyons, Israel, and Ellis to set up a practice as Stirling and Gowan. Their first built project – a small development of private apartments Langham House Close (1955–58) – was regarded as a landmark in the development of 'brutalist' residential architecture, although this was a description both architects rejected. Another result of Stirling & Gowan's collaboration is the Department of Engineering building at the University of Leicester (1959–63), noted for its technological and geometric character, marked by the use of three-dimensional drawings based on axonometric projection seen either from above (in a bird's eye view) or below (in a worm's eye view). The project brought Stirling to a global audience.

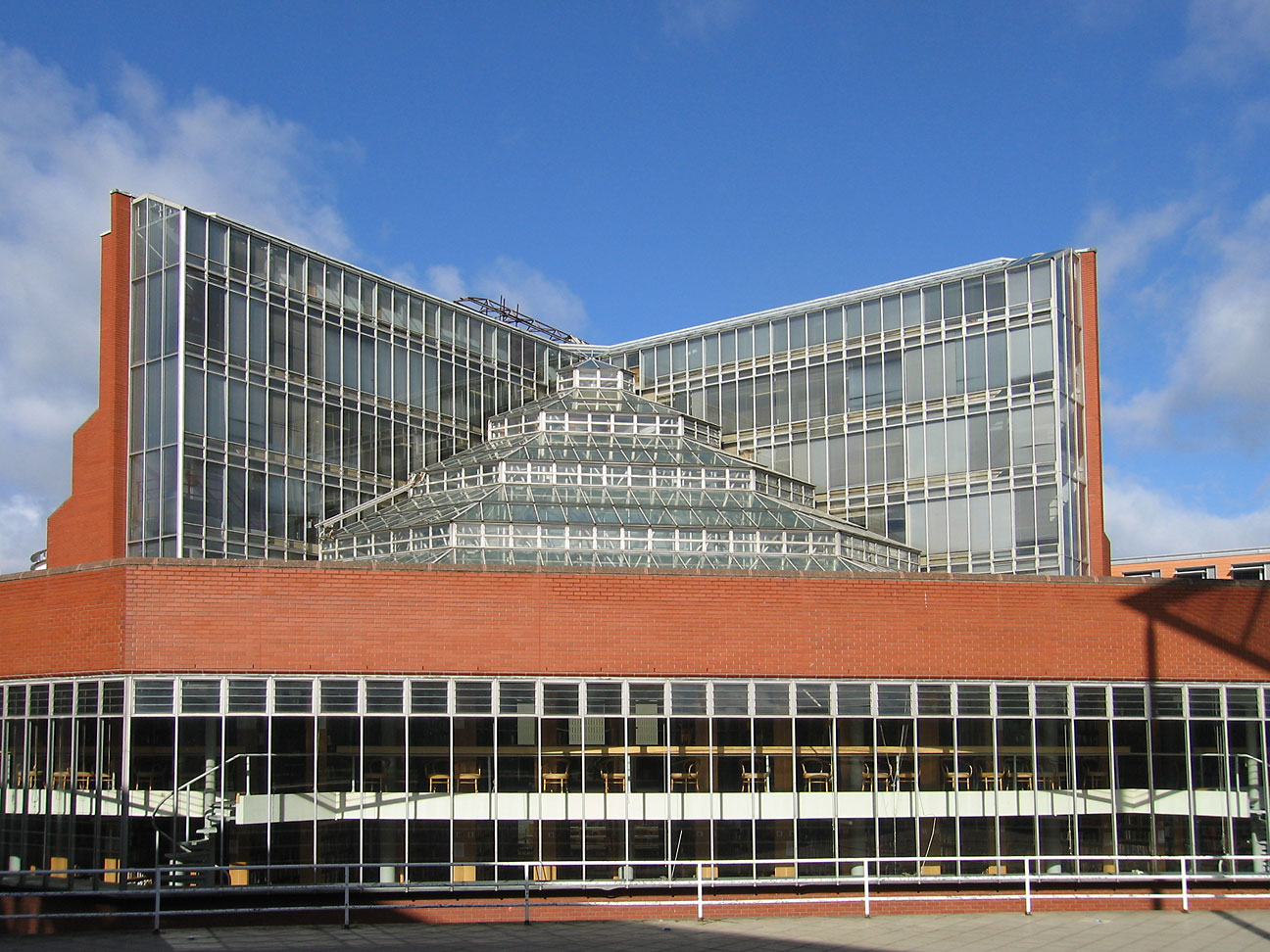
History Faculty Library, University of Cambridge (1968)

In 1963, Stirling and Gowan separated; Stirling then set up on his own, taking with him the office assistant Michael Wilford (who later became a partner). Stirling then oversaw two projects: the History Faculty Library at the University of Cambridge and the Florey Building accommodation block for The Queen's College, Oxford. He also completed a training centre for Olivetti in Haslemere, Surrey and housing for the University of St Andrews both of which made prominent use of pre-fabricated elements, GRP for Olivetti and pre-cast concrete panels at St Andrews.

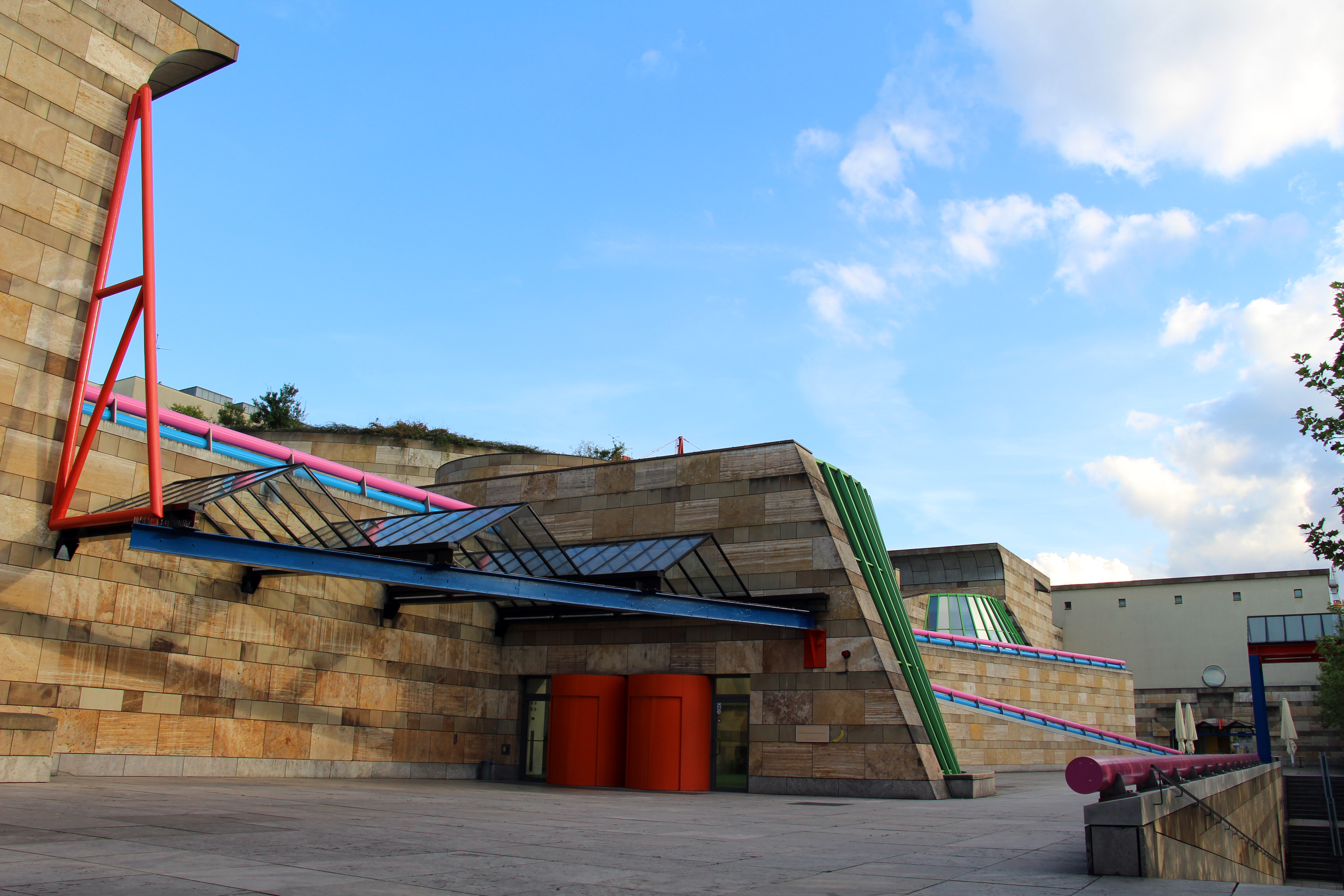
Neue Staatsgalerie, Stuttgart (1984)

During the 1970s, Stirling's architectural language began to change as the scale of his projects moved from small (and not very profitable) to very large. His architecture became more overtly neoclassical, though it remained deeply imbued with modernism. This produced a wave of large-scale urban projects, most notably three museum projects for Düsseldorf, Cologne, and Stuttgart. He won the design competition for the Neue Staatsgalerie in Stuttgart with a design that played off of Berlin's neoclassical Altes Museum, but without that building's neoclassical facade. The building came to be seen as an example of postmodernism, a label which stuck but which he himself rejected, and was considered by many to be his most important work.

As part of the worldwide expansion of Stirling and Wilford's practice beginning in the 1970s, the firm completed four significant buildings in the U.S., all university structures: an addition for the Rice University School of Architecture in Houston, Texas; the Arthur M. Sackler Museum at Harvard University in Cambridge, Massachusetts; the Schwartz Center for the Performing Arts at Cornell University in Ithaca, New York; and the Biological Sciences Library at the University of California, Irvine. Among unrealized projects in the US are designs for Columbia University and a competition proposal for the Walt Disney Concert Hall in Los Angeles.

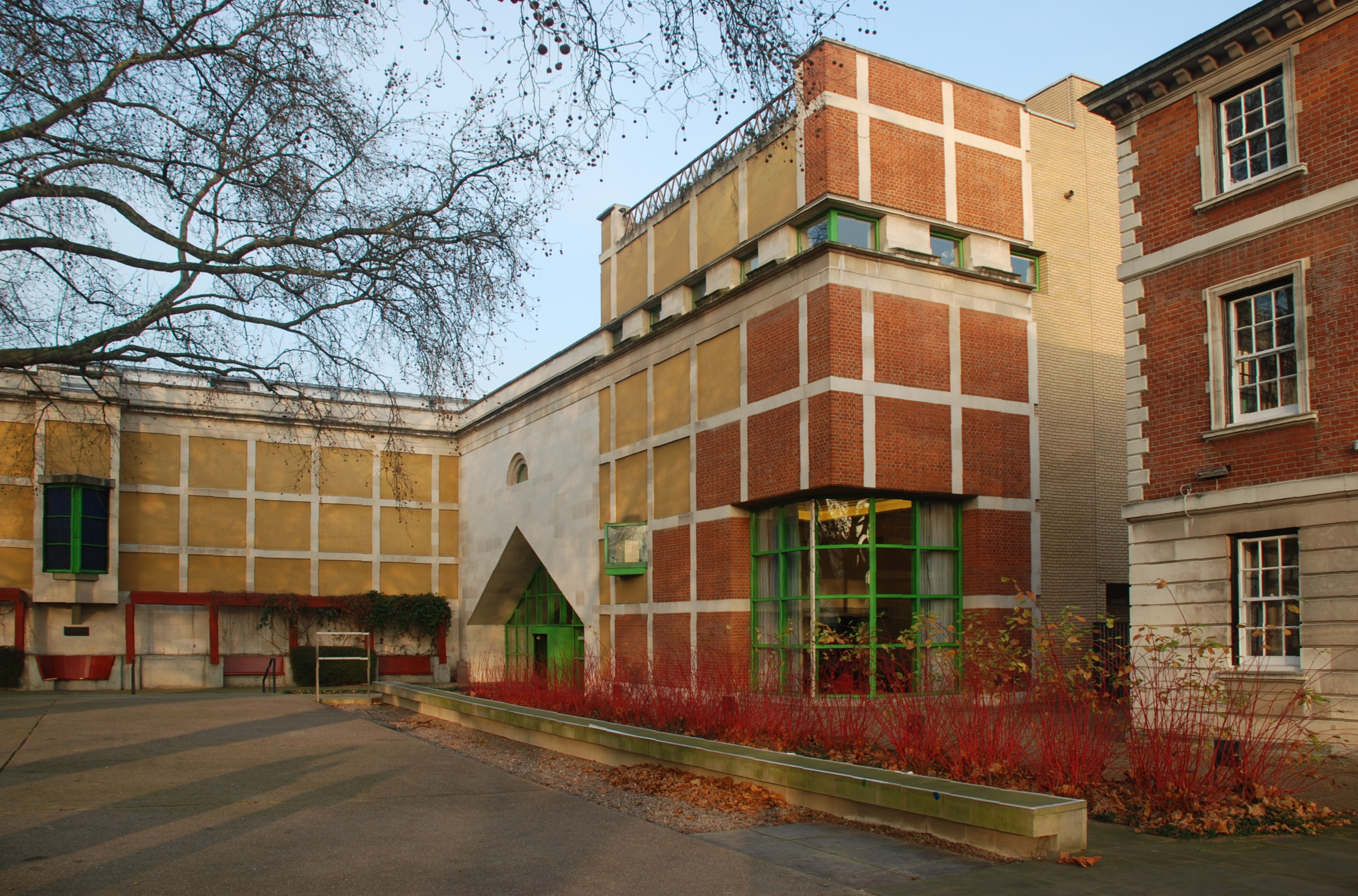
Clore Gallery, London (1980–87)

In 1981, Stirling was awarded the Pritzker Prize. Stirling received a series of important commissions in England – the Clore Gallery for the Turner Collection at the Tate Britain, London (1980–87); the Tate Liverpool (1984, but since then heavily altered and no longer recognisable as a Stirling project). The last building he completed during his life was the Venice Biennale Bookshop (1989–91, with Thomas Muirhead). No 1 Poultry in London (1988–98), one of Stirling's final designs, was posthumously completed by Wilford.

In June 1992, Stirling was awarded a knighthood. After consulting with Michael Wilford, he accepted the award on the grounds that it might help their practice.

== Personal life ==
In 1966 Stirling married the designer Mary Shand, the stepdaughter of the writer P. Morton Shand. They had one son and two daughters.

== Death and legacy ==
Three days after the announcement of his knighthood, Stirling was hospitalised in London with a painful hernia. He died on 25 June 1992 following surgical complications. In accordance with his wishes, his ashes were buried near to his memorial at Christ Church, Spitalfields. After Stirling's death, Michael Wilford (who had become a partner in 1971) continued the practice.

The Stirling Prize, a British annual prize for architecture since 1996, was named after him.

Many architects admire Stirling's work, but opinion has been divided. After Stirling's death, Italian architect and critic Vittorio Gregotti wrote that "from now on, everything will be more difficult". Writing in The Guardian, Andrew Saint called Stirling "A fearless experimentalist, a memorable innovator in form and a pungent character," but declared that, "he lacked the inner maturity, the breadth of reflection and the depth of discipline required for the highest level of architectural achievement." Rather more cuttingly, Jonathan Meades says that "His buildings, like their bombastic maker, looked tough but were perpetual invalids, basket cases."

== Notable projects ==
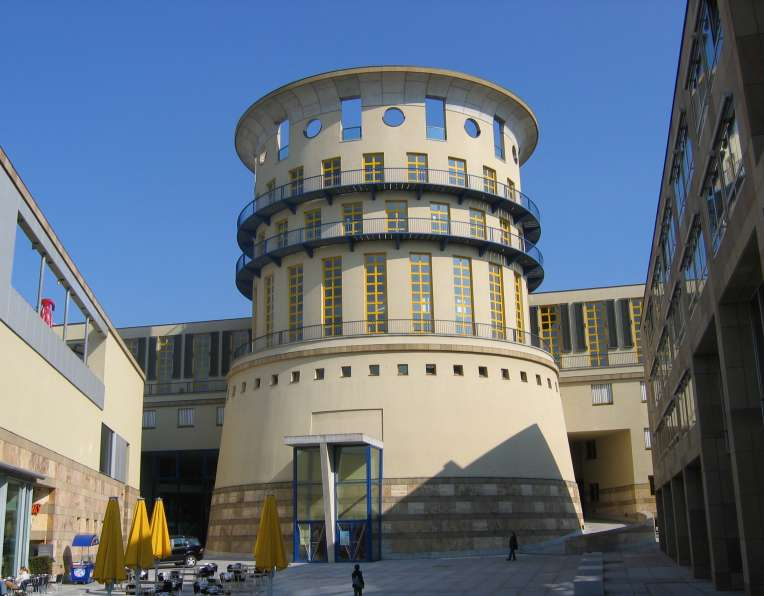
State University of Music and Performing Arts, Stuttgart

- 1958 London: Langham House Close –flats at Ham Common (with James Gowan)
- 1959 Leicester University: Faculty of Engineering (with James Gowan)
- 1961 London: Camberwell School Assembly Hall
- 1964 St Andrews University: Andrew Melville Hall of Residence
- 1968 Cambridge University: Faculty of History
- 1971 Oxford University: The Queen's College, Florey Building
- 1972 Haslemere, Surrey: Training Centre for Olivetti (extension)
- 1976 Runcorn: Southgate social housing (demolished)
- 1984 Stuttgart: Neue Staatsgalerie
- 1984 Cambridge Massachusetts: Harvard University, Fogg Museum Sackler Galleries (extension)
- 1987 Berlin: Wissenschaftszentrum (Social Science Research campus)
- 1987 London: Tate Britain, Clore Galleries (extension)
- 1989 Paris: Bibliothèque de France (unsuccessful competition entry)
- 1991 Venice: Electa Bookshop for the Venice Biennale (with Tom Muirhead)
- 1997 London: offices and retail at No 1 Poultry, London EC3 (completed posthumously to his designs)
