= USA House =

UK prefabricated houses after World War II

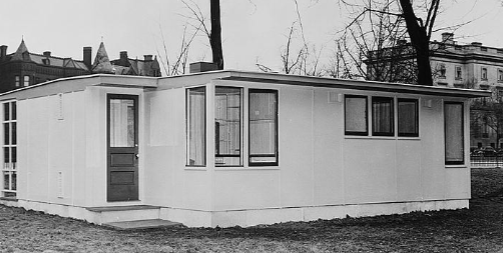
A model USA House on display in Scott Circle in 1945

USA House is a term used to refer to a United States government program to assemble American-manufactured prefabricated houses in the United Kingdom to alleviate that country's homeless problem in the 1940s. The scheme was known as Houses for Britain.

== History ==
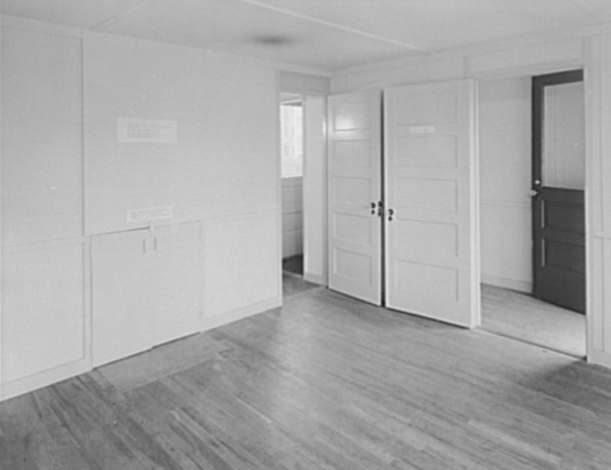
The interior of a USA House living room

=== Background ===
USA House was undertaken by the U.S. government at the behest of the British government under the terms of the Lend Lease Act. At the time, the United States was considered the world leader in prefabricated building techniques; a 1943 proposal by the Union of Soviet Architects had even suggested the purchase of American prefabrication technologies to deal with the Soviet Union's own housing dilemmas. Details of the arrangement were brokered by John Maynard Keynes.

According to a period news report, the program was designed to "help shelter England's bombed-out population". Initial plans called for the construction of 30,000 homes in the United States which would be shipped to, and assembled in, Great Britain. The first of the bungalow-style homes constructed for the program were erected in the UK during the summer of 1945.

=== Criticism and cancellation ===
The program suffered, early on, from domestic United States criticism. Americans voiced opposition to the amount of lumber resources being devoted to foreign aid projects and expressed incredulity that war measures such as Lend Lease were being used to aid "everyday Britons". In the UK the program was also received skeptically after the first shipment of houses arrived damaged. Design factors of the buildings were also met with disfavor by Britons. For instance, the USA House was outfitted with an American-style bathtub, which is shorter and more shallow than the type used in Britain.

Despite the original program goal of 30,000 homes, only 8,462 were ultimately supplied. According to a period report to the Cabinet of the United Kingdom, the British government cancelled the remaining order of 22,000 units following the termination of Lend Lease by the United States and due to Britain's inability to pay the full price of each house. Contemporary accounts attribute a variety of structural deficiencies in the buildings, such as differences in the foundation slab between the USA House and that of locally-built British temporary shelters, as contributing to the British government decision not to see the program through to completion.

== Design ==
The USA House bungalows were timber-framed structures with a floor space of 600 square feet (56 m^{2}). Each building consisted of two bedrooms, a living room, a bathroom, and a kitchen, and was designed with a life expectancy of 10 years.

== See also ==
- Prefabs in the United Kingdom

== Bibliography ==
- Kwak, Nancy (2015). A World of Homeowners: American Power and the Politics of Housing Aid. University of Chicago Press. ISBN 9780226282497.
