= Burt Committee =

Working party set up by the UK government

The Burt Committee was a working party set up by the government of the United Kingdom during World War II to provide guidance on the housing shortage. The committee was chaired by Sir George Burt.

The committee had the correct title of the Interdepartmental Committee on House Construction. It was established in September 1942 by the Minister of Health, the Minister of Works and the Secretary of State for Scotland. The committee was briefed to consider which methods and materials would be most cost-effective and efficient for providing houses after war damage in The Blitz and slum clearance had left many homeless.

The committee favoured prefabricated housing as a solution to the problems, and their recommendations resulted in the Housing (Temporary Accommodation) Act 1944, which itself resulted in the Emergency Factory Made programme.

== Sources ==
- DTi Report on prefabricated buildings
- Brief history of government housing policy
