= Ukraine Democracy Defense Lend-Lease Act of 2022 =

2022 U.S. law authorizing arms transfers to Ukraine

- Long title: An Act To provide enhanced authority for the President to enter into agreements with the Government of Ukraine to lend or lease defense articles to that Government to protect civilian populations in Ukraine from Russian military invasion, and for other purposes.
- Nicknames: Ukraine Lend-Lease Act
- Enacted by: the 117th United States Congress
- Effective: May 9, 2022

Citations
- Public law: Pub. L. 117–118 (text) (PDF)
- Statutes at Large: 136 Stat. 1184

Legislative history
- Introduced in the Senate as S. 3522 by John Cornyn (R–TX) on January 19, 2022; Committee consideration by Senate Foreign Relations; Passed the Senate on April 6, 2022 (voice vote); Passed the House of Representatives on April 28, 2022 (417–10); Signed into law by President Joe Biden on May 9, 2022

The Ukraine Democracy Defense Lend-Lease Act of 2022 was an act of the United States Congress that facilitated the supply of materiel to the Ukrainian government in a manner similar to the World War II Lend-Lease Act in response to the Russian invasion of Ukraine.

The Ukraine Democracy Defense Lend-Lease Act expired in September 2023, without being used.

== Provisions ==
The full title of the act is "An act to provide enhanced authority for the President to enter into agreements with the Government of Ukraine to lend or lease defense articles to that Government to protect civilian populations in Ukraine from Russian military invasion, and for other purposes."

The legislation reduces red tape on exports of defense equipment from the United States to Ukraine, in order to ensure that the equipment is delivered promptly. It is applicable to fiscal years 2022 and 2023.

The legislation is named in reference to the World War II era Lend-Lease program that supplied US allies in the fight against the Axis powers and is credited with being a deciding factor in the war.

== Passage of legislation ==
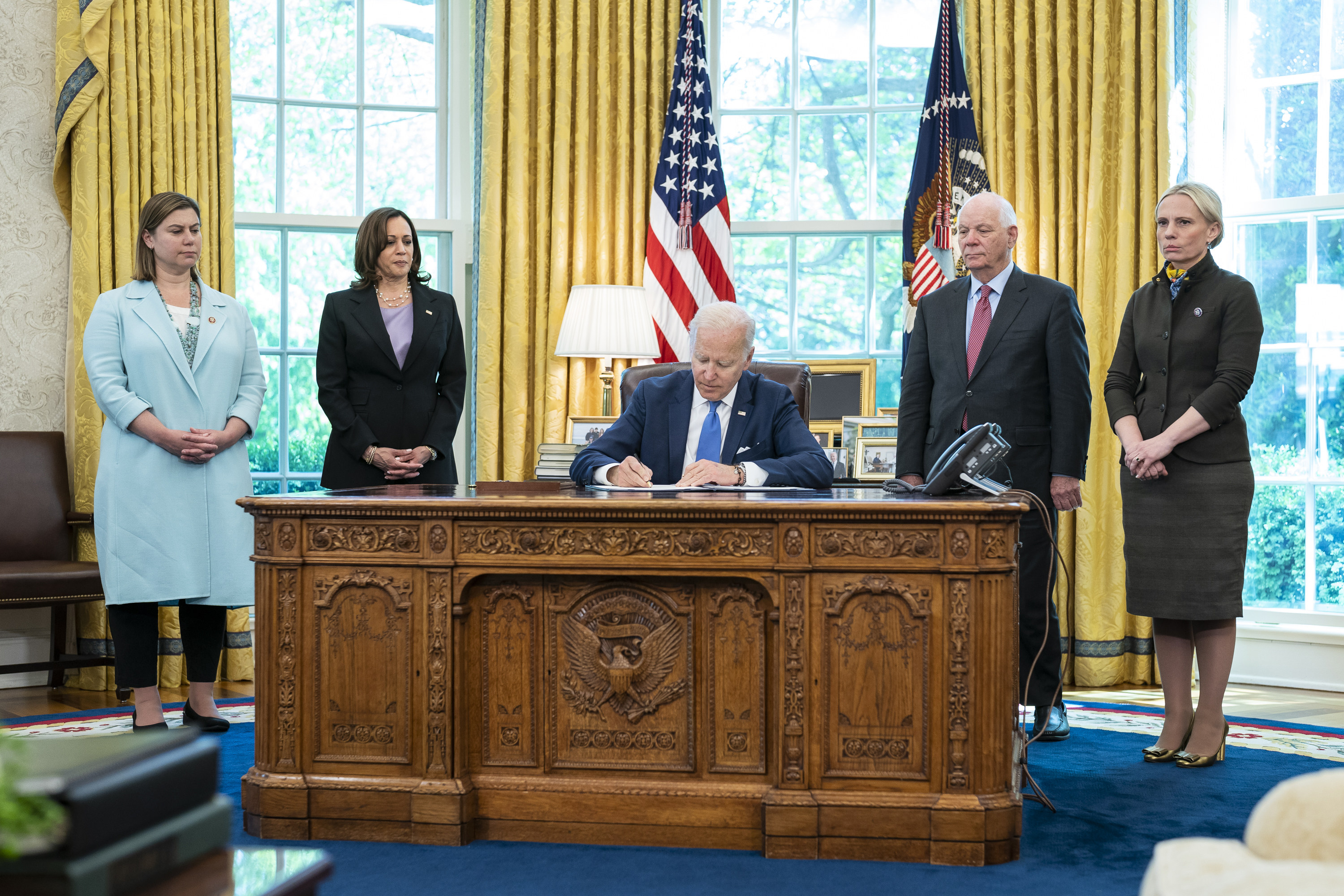
President Biden signs the Ukraine Democracy Defense Lend-Lease Act of 2022 into law.

The bill was passed unanimously in the US Senate on April 6, 2022, and passed in the House of Representatives by a vote of 417–10 on April 28, 2022.

The ten representatives, all from the Republican Party, who voted against the bill were: Andy Biggs of Arizona, Dan Bishop of North Carolina, Warren Davidson of Ohio, Matt Gaetz of Florida, Paul Gosar of Arizona, Marjorie Taylor Greene of Georgia, Thomas Massie of Kentucky, Ralph Norman of South Carolina, Scott Perry of Pennsylvania and Tom Tiffany of Wisconsin.

President Joe Biden signed the bill into law on May 9, 2022, Soviet Victory Day, a date which was seen as a "rejoinder to Russian President Vladimir Putin, who has seized on Victory in Europe Day – the anniversary of Germany's unconditional surrender in 1945 and Russia's biggest patriotic holiday – to rally his people behind the invasion."

== Text ==
SECTION 1. SHORT TITLE.

This Act may be cited as the “Ukraine Democracy Defense Lend-Lease Act of 2022”.

SEC. 2. LOAN AND LEASE OF DEFENSE ARTICLES TO THE GOVERNMENTS OF UKRAINE AND EASTERN FLANK COUNTRIES.

(a) Authority To Lend Or Lease Defense Articles To Certain Governments.—

(1) IN GENERAL.—Subject to paragraph (2), for fiscal years 2022 and 2023, the President may authorize the United States Government to lend or lease defense articles to the Government of Ukraine or to governments of Eastern European countries impacted by the Russian Federation’s invasion of Ukraine to help bolster those countries' defense capabilities and protect their civilian populations from potential invasion or ongoing aggression by the armed forces of the Government of the Russian Federation.
(2) EXCLUSIONS.—For the purposes of the authority described in paragraph (1) as that authority relates to Ukraine, the following provisions of law shall not apply:
(A) Section 503(b)(3) of the Foreign Assistance Act of 1961 (22 U.S.C. 2311(b)(3)).
(B) Section 61 of the Arms Export Control Act (22 U.S.C. 2796).
(3) CONDITION.—Any loan or lease of defense articles to the Government of Ukraine under paragraph (1) shall be subject to all applicable laws concerning the return of and reimbursement and repayment for defense articles loan or leased to foreign governments.
(4) DELEGATION OF AUTHORITY.—The President may delegate the enhanced authority under this subsection only to an official appointed by the President by and with the advice and consent of the Senate.

(b) Procedures For Delivery Of Defense Articles.—Not later than 60 days after the date of the enactment of this Act, the President shall establish expedited procedures for the delivery of any defense article loaned or leased to the Government of Ukraine under an agreement entered into under subsection (a) to ensure timely delivery of the article to that Government.

(c) Definition Of Defense Article.—In this Act, the term “defense article” has the meaning given that term in section 47 of the Arms Export Control Act (22 U.S.C. 2794).

== Lack of use and 2023 expiry ==
Ukrainian diplomats lobbied for extension of the Ukraine Democracy Defense Lend-Lease Act beyond 2023, but it expired on September 30, 2023. No weapons were ever delivered to Ukraine under the terms of the act. Instead, three other American budget programs were used to supply materiel to Ukraine: the Ukraine Security Assistance Initiative, Foreign Military Financing, and Presidential Drawdown Authority.

Senator John Cornyn, who introduced the initial bill, attempted to reauthorize the act in April 2024 with cosponsorships from fellow Republican Tim Scott and Democrats Chris Coons and Jeanne Shaheen. Their proposal would have extended the act's power through 2026, waived a five-year cap on defense lending to allies, and removed the need of a presidential declaration of emergency to give military aid to "countries impacted by Russian aggression". However, the bill was not passed and the 2025 defense budget did not include mention of the Lend-Lease Act.

== See also ==
- Lend-Lease – WWII program to provide U.S. allies with free armaments
- List of foreign aid to Ukraine during the Russo-Ukrainian War
- United States foreign aid
