= Housing (Temporary Accommodation) Act 1944 =

Act of the Parliament of the United Kingdom

Housing (Temporary Accommodation) Act 1944 (Note: Section 9(1).)
- Act of Parliament
- Parliament of the United Kingdom
- Long title: An Act to make provision for temporary housing accommodation, and for purposes connected therewith.
- Citation: 7 & 8 Geo. 6. c. 36
- Territorial extent: England and Wales; Scotland; (Note: Section 9(4).)

Dates
- Royal assent: 10 October 1944
- Commencement: 10 October 1944 (Note: The Acts of Parliament (Commencement) Act 1793.)
- Repealed: England and Wales: 10 August 1972; Scotland: 27 August 1972
Other legislation
Amended by	National Loans Act 1968
Repealed by	England and Wales: Housing Finance Act 1972; Scotland: Housing (Financial Provisions) (Scotland) Act 1972

Status: Repealed

Text of statute as originally enacted

The Housing (Temporary Accommodation) Act 1944 (7 & 8 Geo. 6. c. 36) was an act of the Parliament of the United Kingdom which was passed in order to provide solutions to the housing crisis which occurred at the end of World War II.

The act was the responsibility of the Ministry of Reconstruction, and came in response to the recommendations of the Burt Committee, which had been established in 1942.

The government aimed to provide enough homes for each family who required an individual dwelling, which it perceived had been the situation in 1939 prior to the outbreak of war. However, the Blitz had rendered some 450,000 homes either completely destroyed or uninhabitable. A secondary intention of the act was the completion of the pre-war slum clearance project.

The act provided for a number of strategies to solve the housing crisis:

- An increase in the labour force of the building industry to pre-war levels of over 1 million
- The construction of at least 300,000 homes during the two-year period after the act, under the Emergency Factory Made programme
- To prevent price inflation caused by high demand on building services
- To subsidise privately built houses
- To provide for the construction of temporary, prefabricated housing

A budget of £150 million was committed to the project.

== See also ==
- Robert Greenwood Tarran
