= Atholl steel house =

The Atholl steel house can refer to a steel-framed house or a steel-clad house built in the United Kingdom as a non-traditional house in the Homes fit for heroes period in the 1920s or to replace housing stock after the Second World War in the late 1940s.

Atholl Steel Houses was formed by Sir William Beardmore and the Duke of Atholl in 1924. The company built prefabricated houses from standard steel parts produced at the Beardmore steel plant at Mossend. Construction took place at the Dalmuir Locomotive Works, where there was surplus capacity due to the absence of orders for locomotives between 1924 and 1927.

Included in BRE Report 469 - Non traditional houses.

== See also ==
- Council house
- Pre-fab
- Semi-detached house
