= Robert Greenwood Tarran =

British civil engineer (1892–1955)

- Born: 25 April 1892; Kingston upon Hull, East Riding of Yorkshire
- Died: 20 September 1955 (aged 63); Kingston upon Hull, East Riding of Yorkshire
- Occupations: Civil engineering contractor; Managing director; Politician; Sheriff of Hull
- Organization(s): Tarran Industries, Ltd.
- Spouse: Alice Petch (m. 1917)

Robert Greenwood Tarran (25 April 1892 – 20 September 1955) was a British civil engineering contractor and managing director of Tarran Industries, Ltd. He was an elected member of Hull City Council and served as Sheriff of Hull and as its chief Air Raid Warden during the Second World War. He also organised the evacuation of civilians from Hull. His popularity in the city was considerable.

== Biography ==
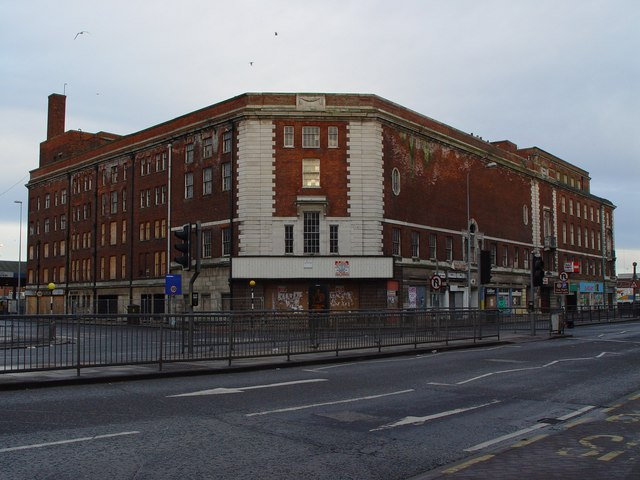
The Regal Cinema, Hull, built by Tarran in 1934, demolished c. 2005

Tarran was born in Kingston upon Hull in 1892, the eldest son of Arthur Tarran and Emily Peat Tarran. In 1911, he was working as a joiner, the same occupation as his father. In September 1914, he enlisted with the Northumbrian Field Ambulance Service, and served with the Royal Army Medical Corps through 1919. He served with the Home Expeditionary Forces and in France, was awarded the 1914–15 Star, the British War Medal and the Victory Medal.

Tarran began his company, Tarran Industries, Ltd., in 1919 in a small loft for which he paid half a crown a week in rent. By 1937, he was employed more than 3,000 men. He worked extensively during the Second World War under contract to the War Department, building hospitals, airfields, hospitals and barges. In 1941, he had a government contract worth £3 million for fortifying parts of Britain's east coast against German invasion. In August of that year, he officially welcomed the King and Queen to Hull.

Tarran Industries became known for prefabricated houses during the war, almost 20,000 of which were erected during the latter years of, and immediately after, the war under the Housing (Temporary Accommodation) Act 1944. His company eventually employed 10,000 people.

Tarran held a number of patents. Before the success of his appeal he founded another business in Scotland but he still spent time in Hull, and died at home on 20 September 1955.

== Legal issues ==
In December 1947, he was convicted of making and publishing a false statement in the company's 1943 balance sheet, and sentenced to nine months hard labour. The conviction was quashed on appeal four months later.

Tarran's conviction followed first a 44-day hearing before Hull's stipendiary magistrate, after which Tarran, who pleaded not guilty, was granted bail at £100, then a 32-day special Assizes hearing at Hull Guildhall, in front of Mr Justice Pritchard.

Tarran faced six charges: making and publishing the company's 1942 balance sheet and of conspiring with Herbert Bland Southern (assistant to the general manager for contracts, aged 64 at the time) to publish it; and the same for the 1943 balance sheet. Southern was charged with both counts of conspiracy.

Sentence was passed on 3 December 1947. The jury deliberated for four hours and two minutes, and Pritchard told them that he would ask that they not be called for jury service again. Tarran was acquitted of four charges (those relating to 1942, and the 1943 conspiracy charge), but convicted of the other two. His co-defendant was acquitted of both charges.

Tarran's defence counsel, My C. Paley Scott, said to the judge:

I would like to put it to you that this was not a case of a man making a false statement for direct self-interest. I put it as the case of a captain of a ship which is in danger of foundering, who honestly believed it was in the interests of everybody, not merely of himself, that it was better that that ship should carry on to the haven he saw ahead at the end of the war... I ask your Lordship to be lenient. This man has lost that which he spent his life in building. He has been in terrible suspense in this trial throughout almost the whole of this year, and has suffered punishment already almost more dreadful than anyone would wish to pass upon him in the circumstances of this case. I ask you to deal with this as mercifully as possible.

He was sentenced to nine months hard labour on each count, to run concurrently, and jailed at Leeds.

In his summing-up, Pritchard said that Tarran and Southern had both led exemplary lives and that Tarran had spent apparently the whole of his life in the service of his creation. He added that "they can both look back upon their lives with pride".

Tarran's appeal was based on the conviction being against the weight of evidence. It succeeded on 23 April 1948.

== Bibliography ==
- —— (1948). My Judgment. Rex V Robert Greenwood Tarran. In The Court of Criminal Appeal, 23rd April 1948. Author.
