= Alexandra Road Estate =

Housing estate in the London Borough of Camden

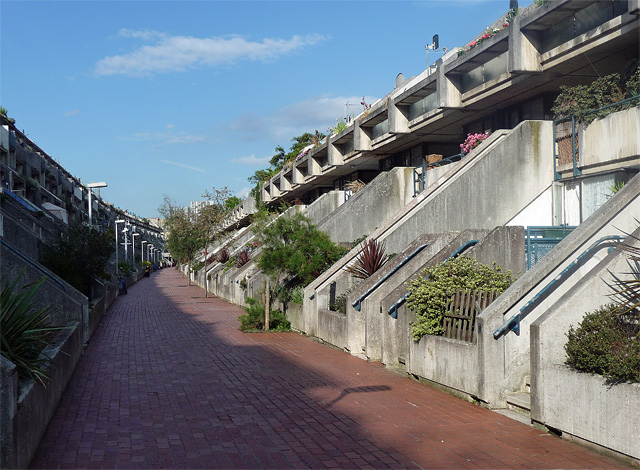
- View from Rowley Way
- Interactive map of Alexandra Road Estate

General information
- Location: London Borough of Camden
- Coordinates: 51.539°N 0.183°W
- No. of units: 520

Construction
- Constructed: 1972–1978
- Architect: Neave Brown
- Style: Brutalism

Listing

Listed Building – Grade II*
- Designated: 18 August 1993
- Reference no.: 1130403

The Alexandra Road Estate (officially the Alexandra and Ainsworth Estate, but often referred to as Rowley Way, the name of its main thoroughfare) is a housing estate in the London Borough of Camden, North London, England. It was designed in a brutalist style in 1968 by Neave Brown of Camden Council's Architects Department. Construction work commenced in 1972 and was completed in 1978. It is constructed from site-cast, board-marked, white, unpainted reinforced concrete. Along with 520 apartments, the site also includes a school, community centre, youth club, heating complex, tenants hall, and parkland. Views of the construction of the development are shown in the 1970s TV detective drama series The Sweeney (Series 3, Episode 9, 1976).

== Estate ==
The estate consists of three parallel east–west blocks, and occupies a crescent-shaped site bounded on the south by Boundary Road, Loudoun Road on the east, Abbey Road on the west, and by the West Coast Main Line to the north. The desire to control the sound and vibration from passing trains was a major consideration in the layout of the estate. Two rows of terraced apartments are aligned along the tracks. The higher, eight-story block directly adjacent to the railway line is organised in the form of a ziggurat, and acts as a noise barrier that blocks the noise of the trains from reaching the interior portion of the site, and its foundations rest on rubber pads that eliminate vibration. A lower, four-storey block runs along the other side of a continuous pedestrian walkway, known as Rowley Way, serving both terraced rows of buildings. The third row of buildings, along the southern edge of the site, parallels another public walkway, Langtry Walk, between this row and the existing earlier buildings of the Ainsworth Estate and defines a public park with play areas between the second and third row of dwellings.

The lower four-storey building along Rowley Way contains maisonettes with shared access, terraces, and gardens overlooking the park at the rear. Maisonettes also occupy the top two levels of the larger eight-storey building opposite, with entrance from a walkway on the 7th floor that runs the entire length of the structure. Dwellings in the lower floor in this block are entered from open stairs serving two dwellings per floor. The flat roofs of the stepped elevation provide private outdoor areas for every home. Garage parking is located beneath the building, and underneath the building at the rear alongside the railway tracks.

== Development and history ==
Since the early 1950s, tower blocks surrounded by public open space had been the method of choice for councils to replace terraced housing in poor condition while keeping the same high population density. However, by the mid-1960s, even before the collapse of Ronan Point, the shortcomings of that method were becoming apparent. Neave Brown believed that ziggurat style terraces, little higher than the terraces they replaced, could provide a better solution. Vehicular traffic could be restricted to basement level. Family-sized flats, bright and airy due to the set-back upper floors, could open, via their own "defensible" front garden, onto ground floor streets/play areas, whilst the higher levels could be used for smaller flats, each with a private balcony.

The Alexandra Road Estate may be seen as Brown's culminating, and largest scale, effort to apply these principles to the design of high-density public housing. Five houses on Winscombe Street, built in 1967, were his first experiment with the terrace type. The Fleet Road project, begun about the same time and consisting of 71 houses, a shop, and a studio, arranged in parallel terraced rows, was a further application of the idea.

=== Public inquiry ===
The estate received much criticism during and after its construction because of its very high cost (particularly compared with tower blocks), caused by the complicated nature of its construction, unforeseen foundation problems, and the delays caused by those at a time of very high inflation, reaching 20% per year at one point in the 1970s. In 1978 a public inquiry was launched by the Labour-run council to investigate the reasons for overshooting the budget and timetable.

Although there were indeed a significant delay and an increase in cost of approximately four times the originally commissioned tender, the inquiry may have been politically motivated. Mark Swenarton cites several factors for its launch: the campaigning Conservatives tried to allege that Labour was incompetent in managing the council and an increasingly pressured Labour hoping to relieve itself from the public anger of the spending by raising the transparency and potentially find the roots of the problem with the Conservative leadership 1968–1971.

The outcome of the inquiry published in seven reports mainly made "the apparent failure of the councillors to understand the contractual obligations that they had undertaken" responsible for the mismanagement and was not successful in blaming the architect as had been hoped by some. Despite there being no findings of a mismanagement on his part, however, being the subject of a public inquiry destroyed Neave Brown's reputation in the UK where he never built again.

=== Alexandra Road Estate today ===
The estate has suffered less vandalism than many Camden estates, and it was granted Grade II* listed status on 18 August 1993, the first post-war council housing estate to be listed. It was described by Peter Brooke, then Heritage Secretary, as "one of the most distinguished groups of buildings in England since the Second World War."

After a continuing career including international town planning and post-graduate teaching, Brown retrained as a fine artist, to which occupation he devoted his retirement. In October 2017, Brown won the Royal Gold Medal of the Royal Institute of British Architects. Brown died, aged 88, in January 2018.

== Other sites ==
The Highgate New Town/Whittington Estate by Peter Tábori has a similar design.

== See also ==
- List of Brutalist structures
