= John G. Ellis =

Anglo-Californian architect, urban designer and teacher

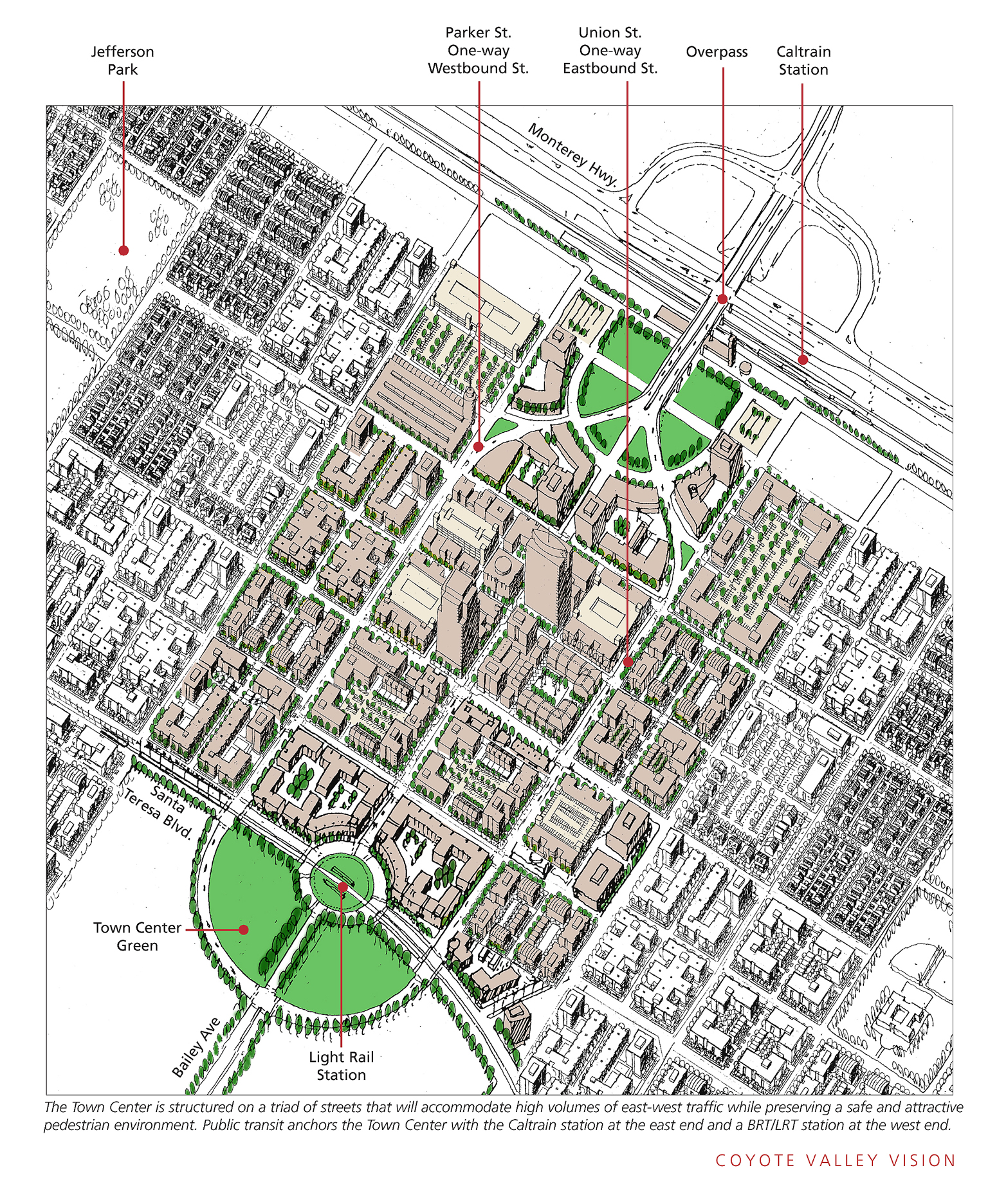
Coyote Valley town center

John Garrett Ellis, AIA, RIBA is an Anglo-Californian architect, urban designer and teacher. He grew up in London, the son of Tom Ellis, the Brutalist architect and was a student at Cambridge University 1965–70 under Sir Leslie Martin, Colin St John Wilson and David Roberts. While a student he ran the Architectural Society and invited numerous distinguished architects to speak including Louis Kahn, the Russian Constructivist Berthold Lubetkin and the American Jack MacAllister. In 1968 he and four other students drove 6,000 miles from London to Moscow and Leningrad and out through Scandinavia to research the work of the Russian Constructivist architects. At Cambridge he was also taught by Richard Saul Wurman (TED talks, etc.) who offered him a position in his office in Philadelphia in the summer of 1969 where he met his late wife Becky, an art historian.

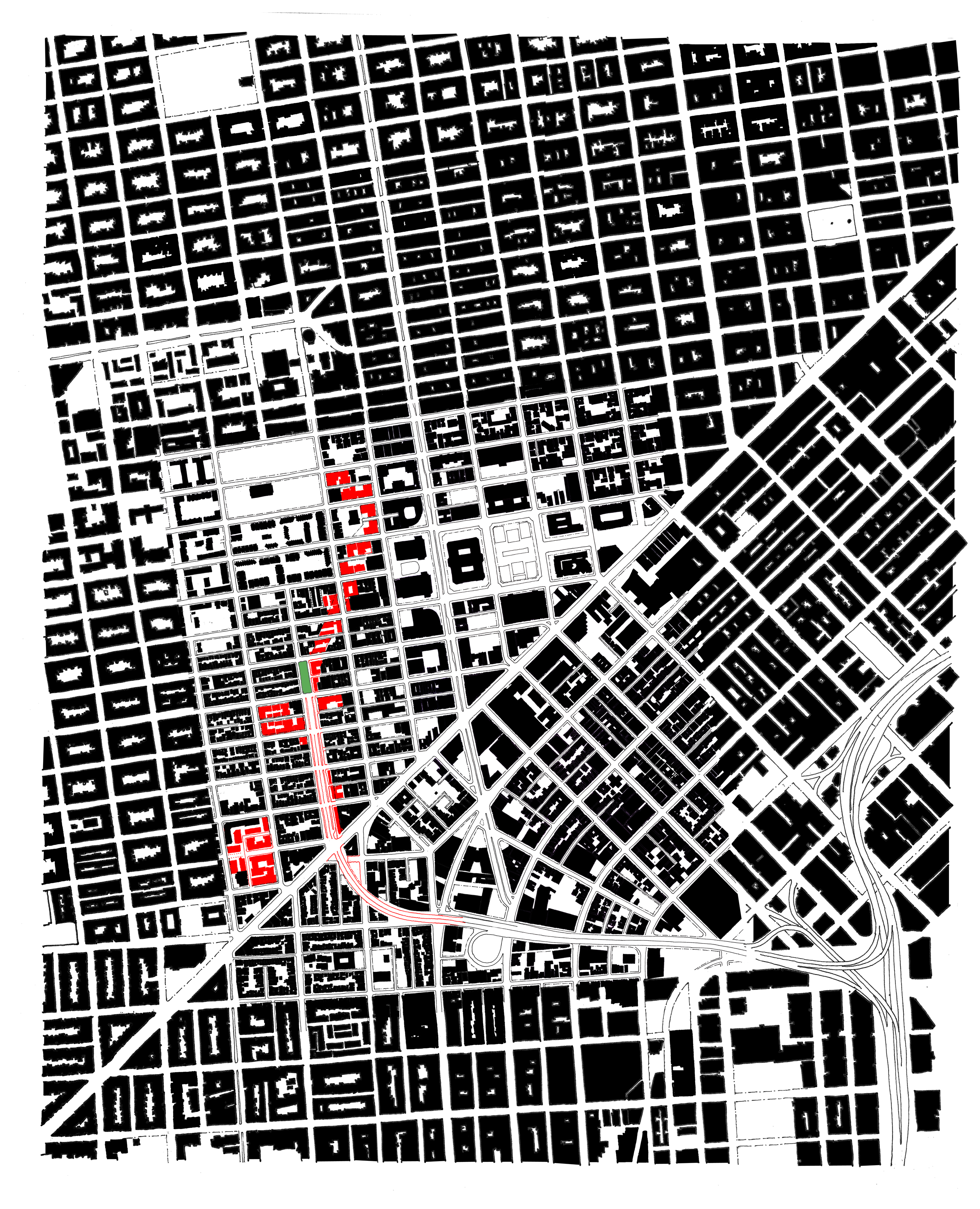
Market/Octavia Plan, San Francisco

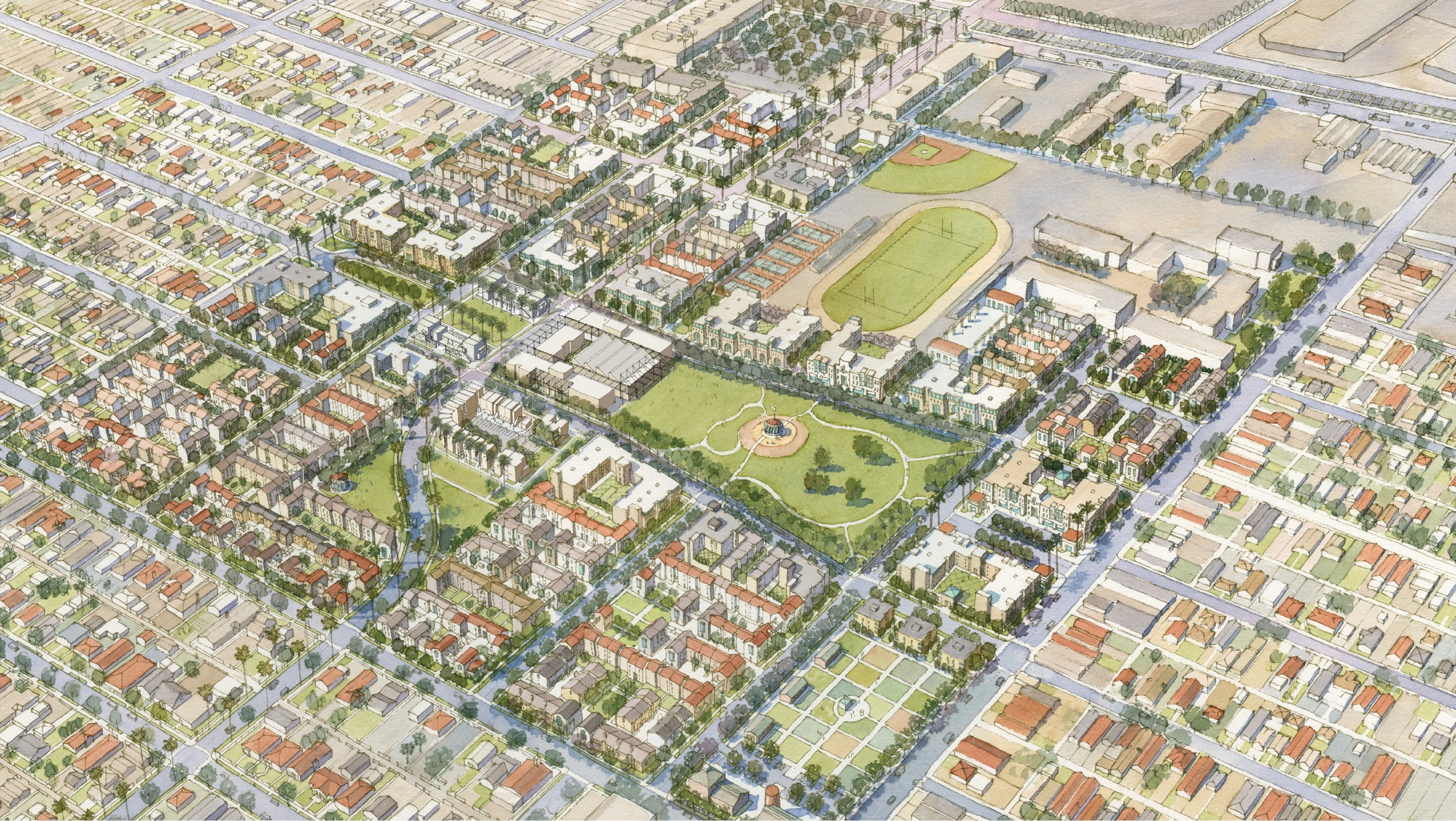
aerial rendering of the complete project

== Early career ==
On graduating, he worked in London for Lyons Israel Ellis (Tom Ellis' firm) on the Polytechnic of Central London (now the University of Westminster) Department of Photography and Communication building on Little Titchfield Street, London. He then returned to Cambridge and worked with David Roberts on a number of projects including an extension to the Fitzwilliam Museum and a Music Room for Trinity Hall. He then joined Richard MacCormac in London who had just started his practice MacCormac Jamieson Prichard (MJP) and worked on some of the early public housing projects the practice was well known for in Milton Keynes and Warrington New Towns.

== Move to California ==
In 1977, Ellis and his family moved to the Bay Area where he has lived, worked and taught. He worked with a number of architectural practices including ten years 1982–92 Kaplan McLaughlin Diaz (KMD) where he was project designer for projects such as Stevenson Place, San Francisco, one of the earliest post-modern high-rise office towers, the iconic twin-towered Oakland Federal Building and the art-Deco inspired U.S. Bank Plaza (Sacramento). He worked from 1992 to 1994 with Anshen & Allen and was project designer for the Far East International Building Shanghai and the Kaiser Medical office building in San Francisco.

Since 1994, Ellis has worked as a partner and director of urban design with Daniel Solomon, a San Francisco architect and teacher, who was one of the founding members of the Congress of the New Urbanism (CNU). In 2001 with Daniel Solomon and Anne Torney the practice was renamed Solomon Ellis Torney (Solomon ETC) and from 2003 to 2010 was an autonomous part of the Philadelphia-based firm Wallace Roberts Todd (WRT). In 2010 the practice joined the Seattle-based firm Mithun and became Mithun/ Solomon.

== Work with Daniel Solomon ==
Ellis, Anne Torney and Daniel Solomon have specialized in the design of affordable housing and urban repair and have participated in the work of the Congress of the New Urbanism. They designed public and affordable housing master plans for several HOPE VI projects at Othello Station in Seattle, Hunters View in San Francisco and Jordan Downs in Los Angeles. The designs aimed to create mixed-income neighborhoods and to integrate previously marginalized communities back into the mainstream of American urbanism. They have also designed student housing for various universities including Weyburn Terrace and Glenrock for UCLA, and Escondido Village at Stanford University.

In 2001 the firm undertook an ambitious plan to transform the Market/Octavia neighborhood in San Francisco after the demolition of the Central Freeway following the 1989 Loma Prieta earthquake into a demonstration project for urban repair. They also produced a master plan in 2004 for Coyote Valley in San Jose for the Greenbelt Alliance entitled 'Getting it Right' to demonstrate how to accommodate the projected growth in the area in a compact, transit-oriented, mixed-use design without resorting to sprawl. Other large scale urban design projects include that for Bin Hai in Tianjin in China which demonstrated how to build an urban fabric with small blocks and perimeter block urbanism in contrast to the conventional Chinese pattern of rows of south-facing slabs in vast superblocks.

== Teaching ==
Ellis has taught part-time at UC Berkeley since 1980 and used to be an adjunct professor at California College of the Arts, CCA (formerly CCAC) in San Francisco. In 2012 he was the inaugural Sir Arthur Marshall Professor of Sustainable Urban Design at Cambridge University where he gave a series of public lectures and ran an urban design studio on master planning for Northwest Cambridge.

== Writing ==
Ellis has been a contributing writer to Architectural Review in London and a collaborator on 'Sustainable Urbanism' by Doug Farr, 2007 John Wiley publisher.

== Honors ==
Ellis's work has won AIA National Honor Awards for the Oakland Federal Building 1992, CNU Charter Awards in 2004 and 2013 for Coyote Valley and UCLA Weyburn Terrace. In 2021 he was elected as a Fellow of the American Institute of Architects (FAIA), and in 2022 as a Fellow of the Congress for the New Urbanism (FCNU).

== Family ==
Ellis was married in 1970 to Rebecca Lynn Freed 1941–2009 and has two children, Benjamin (1971) and Joanna (1974). He married Kathleen Shier Perry, graphic designer in 2016.
