= Council house =

Form of public or social housing in the United Kingdom

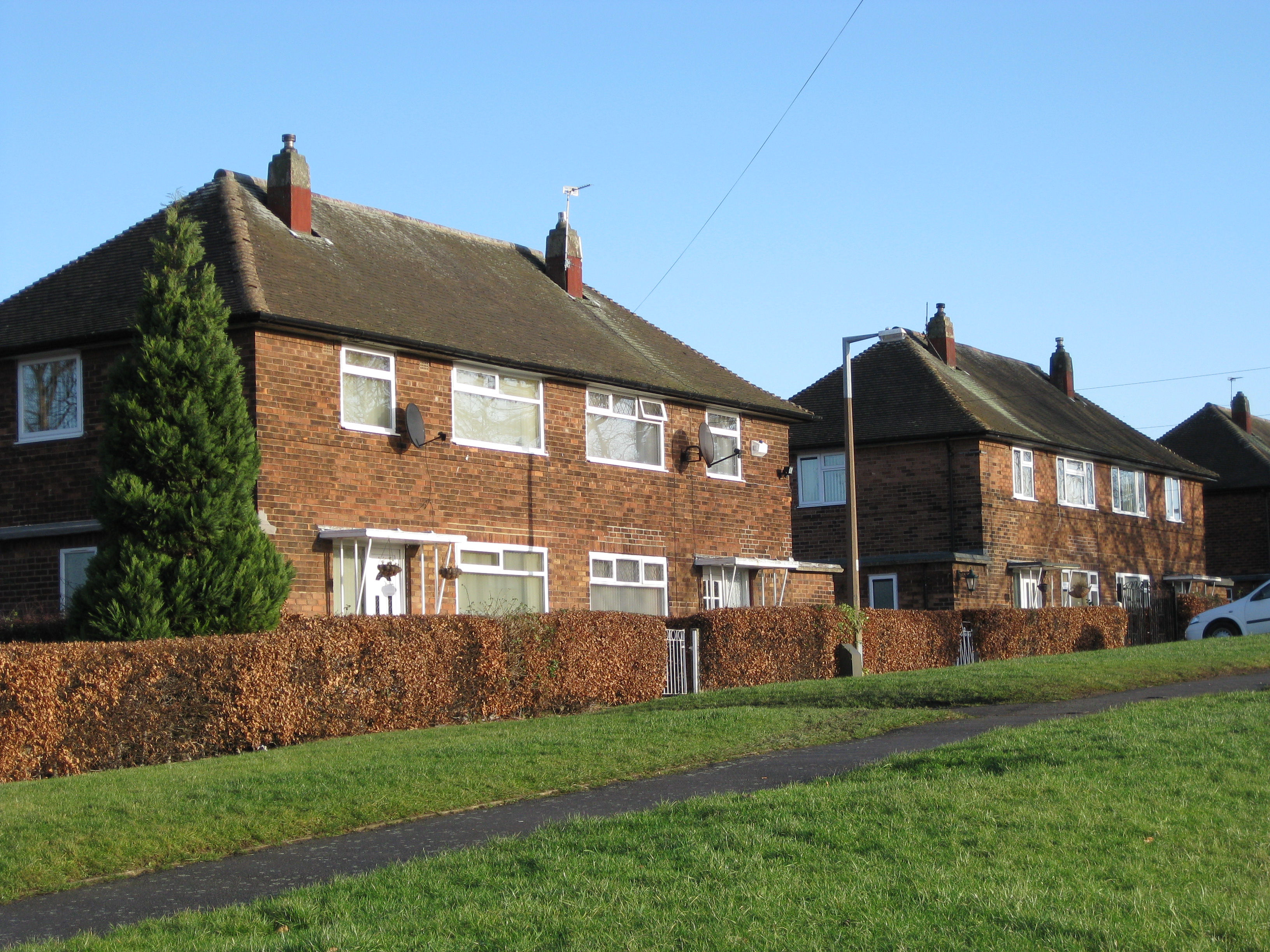
Semi-detached council house in Seacroft, Leeds, West Yorkshire

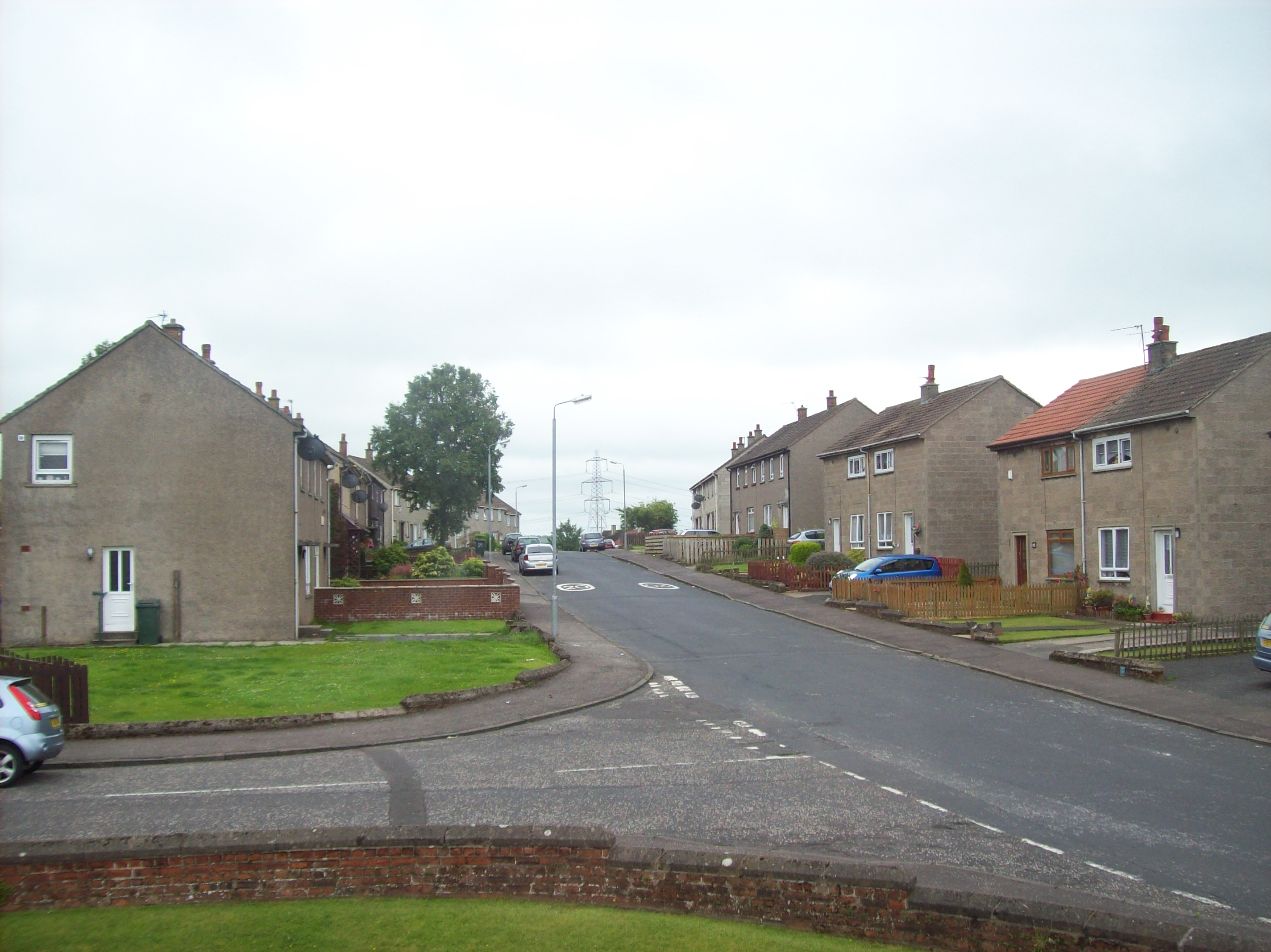
A mixture of council and ex-council housing (through Right to Buy scheme) in Hurlford, East Ayrshire, Scotland

A council house, corporation house or council flat is a form of British public housing built by local authorities. A council estate is a building complex containing a number of council houses and other amenities like schools and shops (though not to be confused with the more general term ''housing estate''). Construction took place mainly from 1919 to the 1980s, as a result of the Housing Act 1919. Though more council houses have been built since then, fewer have been built in recent years. Local design variations exist; however, all followed local authority building standards. The Housing Act 1985 and the Housing Act 1988 facilitated the transfer of council housing to not-for-profit housing associations with access to private finance, and these new housing associations became the providers of most new public-sector housing. The characterisation of council houses as 'problem places' was key for leading this movement of transferring public housing stock to the private arena. By 2003, 36.5% of the social rented housing stock was held by housing associations.

== History ==
House design in the United Kingdom is defined by a series of Housing Acts, and public housing house design is defined by government-directed guidelines and central governments' relationship with local authorities. From the first interventions in the Public Health Act 1875 (38 & 39 Vict. c. 55) to the Housing of the Working Classes Act 1900, council houses could be general housing for the working class, general housing, part of slum clearance programmes or just homes provided for the most needy. They could be funded directly by local councils, through central government incentive or by revenue obtained when other houses were sold. Increasingly, they have been transferred through the instrument of housing associations into the private sector.

An early use of the new powers was in Bath, where 36 new houses named Lampard's Buildings were built in 1900 on the compulsorily purchased site of a row of rat-infested cottages.

=== First World War housing ===
Woolwich Borough Council was responsible for the Well Hall Estate designed for workers at the munition factories at Woolwich Arsenal. The estate and the house were built to the garden suburb philosophy: houses were all different. The estate received the royal seal of approval when, on Friday 24 March 1916, Queen Mary made an unannounced visit.

=== Interwar housing ===
A programme of council house building started after the First World War following on from the David Lloyd George's government's Housing, Town Planning, &c. Act 1919. The 'Addison Act' brought in subsidies for council house building and aimed to provide 500,000 "homes fit for heroes" within a three-year period although less than half of this target was met. The housing built comprised three-bedroom dwellings with parlour and scullery: larger properties also include a living room. The standards are based on the Tudor Walters Report of 1919, and the Design Manual written according to the 1913 building standards.

The Housing, &c. Act 1923 withdrew subsidies for council houses except for private builders and houses for sale. Councils could undertake to build houses and offer these for sale but also to sell off some of their existing properties. This was essentially reversed by the incoming Labour government of 1924. The Housing (Financial Provisions) Act 1924 passed by the new Labour Government introduced higher subsidies for council housing and also allowed for a contribution to be made from the rates. The housing revenue account was always separated from the general account. This was a major period of council house construction.

The Housing Act 1930 stimulated slum clearance, i.e., the destruction of inadequate houses in the inner cities that had been built before the 1875 act. This released land for housing and the need for smaller two-bedroomed houses to replace the two-up two-down houses that had been demolished. Smaller three-bedroom properties were also built. The Housing Act 1935 led to a continuation of this policy, but the war stopped all construction, and enemy action reduced the usable housing stock.

=== Post-World War II housing ===
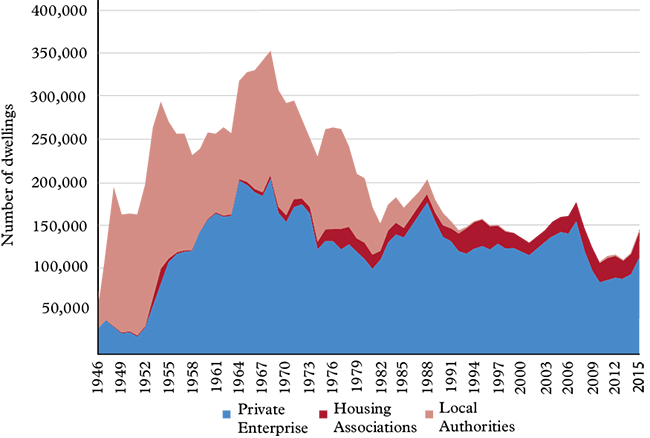
Permanent dwellings completed in England by tenure type, showing the effect of the Housing Act 1980 in curtailing council house construction and reducing total new build numbers

==== Prefabs ====
The Housing (Temporary Accommodation) Act 1944 led to the building of prefab bungalows with a design life of ten years. Innovative steel-framed properties were also tried in an attempt to speed up construction. A number survive well into the 21st century, a testament to the durability of a series of housing designs and construction methods only envisaged to last 10 years.

The Burt Committee, formed in 1942 by the wartime government of Winston Churchill, proposed to address the need for an anticipated 200,000 shortfall in post-war housing stock, by building 500,000 prefabricated houses, with a planned life of up to 10 years within five years of the end of the Second World War. The eventual bill, under the post-war Labour government of Prime Minister Clement Attlee, agreed to deliver 300,000 units within 10 years, within a budget of £150m. Of 1.2 million new houses built from 1945 to 1951 when the programme officially ended, 156,623 prefab houses were constructed.

==== New Towns Act housing ====
Mainly during the immediate post-war years, and well into the 1950s, council house provision was shaped by the New Towns Act 1946 (9 & 10 Geo. 6. c. 68) and the Town and Country Planning Act 1947 of the 1945–51 Labour government. At the same time this government introduced housing legislation that removed explicit references to housing for the working class and introduced the concept of "general needs" construction (i.e., that council housing should aim to fill the needs for a wide range of society). In particular, Aneurin Bevan, the Minister for Health and Housing, promoted a vision of new estates where "the working man, the doctor and the clergyman will live in close proximity to each other".

=== From 1970s and onwards ===
From the late 1970s, the wider takeover of free market economics propagated by Margaret Thatcher's conservative government sought to reduce the role of the state and the housing sector was further opened for private investors and actors. Deregulation of the mortgage finance sector in the 1980s was particularly significant, with the Housing Act 1988 introducing private competition into the sector. The Housing Act 1988 marked the onset of various policies resulting in the residualisation of the public housing. Residualisation refers to the shrinking of the social housing stock, consisting mostly of deteriorated quality dwellings, and the growing concentration of disadvantaged minorities in such housing. As the residual housing sector is mostly concentrated in lower-income neighbourhoods, a 'neighbourhood effect' manifests, reinforcing the idea of poverty as a problem of the place which has allowed market ideologies to advocate against decommodified housing provision.

The Renters' Rights Act 2025 extends Awaab's Law requirements to the private rented sector, requiring landlords to address hazards including damp and mould within prescribed timeframes, bringing parity with social housing standards.

== Landlord's obligations ==
A landlord's obligations are set out in several pieces of legislation, including the Landlord and Tenant Act 1985, which applies to tenancies entered into after 1961. In summary, section 11 provides that a landlord shall:

- keep in repair the structure and exterior of the dwelling, including drains, gutters and external pipes;
- keep in repair and proper working order the installations in the dwelling for the supply of water, gas, and electricity, and for sanitation (including basins, sinks, baths and sanitary conveniences, but not other fixtures, fittings and appliances for making use of the supply of water, gas or electricity), and keep in repair and proper working order the installation in the dwelling for space heating and heating water.

If a landlord refuses to repair a rented property, the tenant can take action to require them to carry out necessary works and claim compensation.

== Design ==
=== Addison Act housing (1918–1923) ===
The Addison Act 1919 houses were usually three-bedroom houses with a living room and scullery, sometimes also with a parlour. Some had two, four, or even five bedrooms, as well as generously sized back gardens intended for vegetable growing. At most, they were built at 3,000/km^{2}. They were generally built to the recommendations of the Tudor Walters Report. Examples are found in Downham, Watling Estate, and Becontree.

==== Tudor Walters Committee recommendations ====
Tudor Walters Committee recommendations
House without a parlour	Area ft^{2} (m^{2} )	Volume ft^{3} (m^{3} )	House with a parlour	Area ft^{2} (m^{2} )	Volume ft^{3} (m^{3} )
			Parlour	120 (11)	960 (27)
Living room	180 (17)	1,440 (41)	Living room	180 (17)	1,440 (41)
Scullery	80 (7.4)	640 (18)	Scullery	80 (7.4)	640 (18)
Larder	24 (2.2)	–	Larder	24 (2.2)	–
Bedroom No. 1	150 (14)	1,200 (34)	Bedroom No. 1	160 (15)	1,280 (36)
Bedroom No. 2	100 (9.3)	800 (23)	Bedroom No. 2	120 (11)	960 (27)
Bedroom No. 3	65 (6.0)	520 (15)	Bedroom No. 3	110 (10)	880 (25)
Total	855 ft^{2} (79.4 m^{2})			1,055 ft^{2} (98.0 m^{2})	
Desirable minimum sizes, Tudor Walters Committee

=== Labour government homes (1924–1930) ===
The Addison Act 1919, and the severe housing shortage in the early 1920s created the first generation of houses to feature electricity, running water, bathrooms, indoor toilets and front/rear gardens. However, until well into the 1930s, some were built with outdoor toilets. Some did not feature an actual bathroom; the bath could often be found in the kitchen with a design which allowed it to double as a work surface.

The Chamberlain Act 1923 reduced the expected standards. The Wheatley Act 1924 attempted to restore some of them. Under the Addison Act, a house would be 1,000 square feet (93 m^{2}) but after 1924 it would be 620 square feet (58 m^{2}). This was a major period of council house construction.

=== Smaller houses (1931–1939) ===
With the Housing Act 1930, otherwise known as the Greenwood Act, the government signalled a change of priority, slum clearance. Pre-regulation terraced housing was to be cleared and the residents rehoused in new council houses. There was a cut in funding and the housing density on the peripheral estates was increased, leading to a poorer build quality. The former tenants of the inner city properties were displaced far from their workplaces unable to afford the higher rents (though reduced from the 1919 levels) or the cost of transport. Stable communities were broken up, and with it support networks.

=== Temporary prefabs (1941–1950) ===
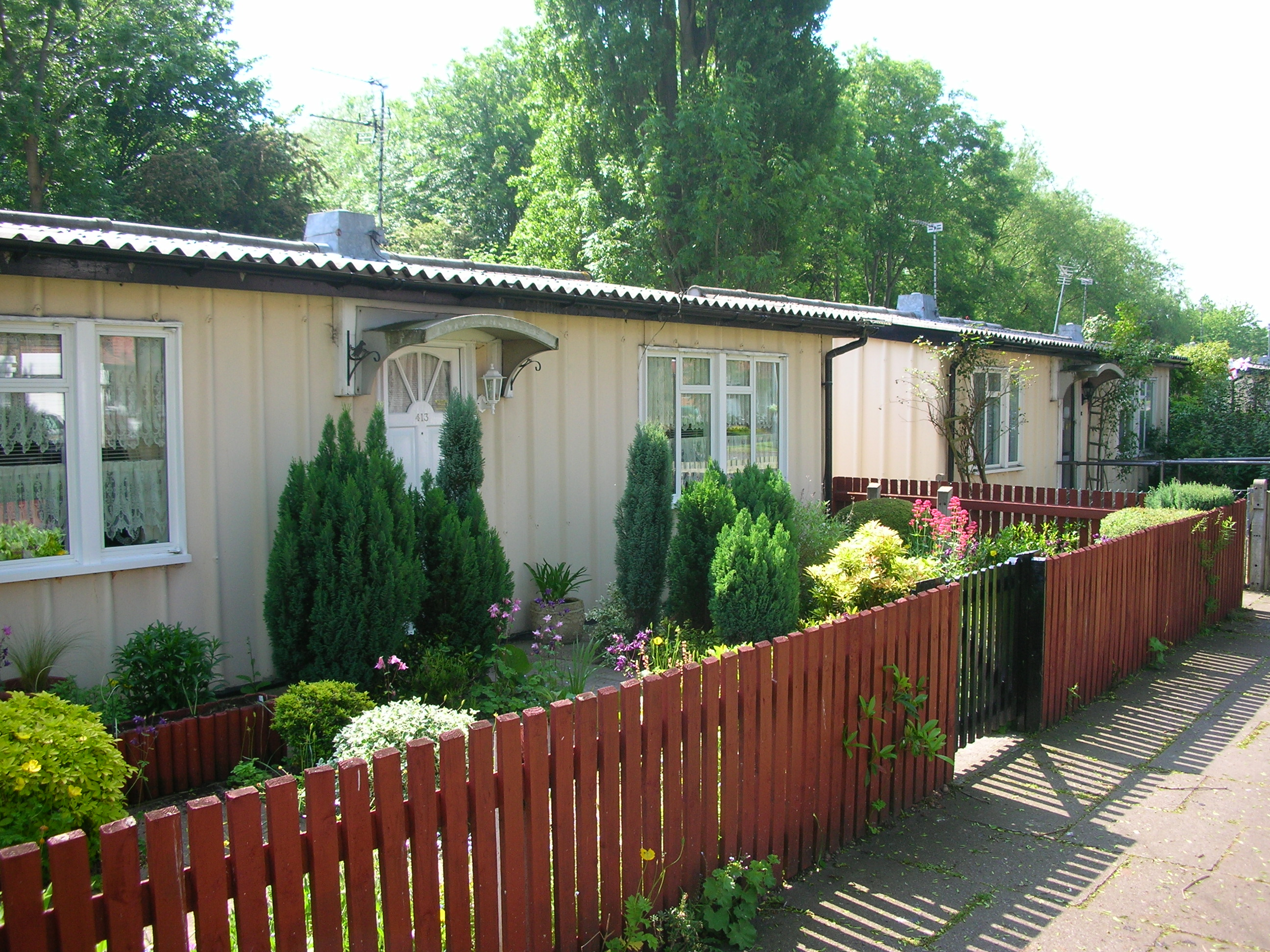
Grade II listed Phoenix prefabs in Wake Green Road, Birmingham

All prefab units approved by the Ministry of Works had to have a minimum floor space size of 635 square feet (59.0 m^{2}), and the sections had to be less than 7' 6" (2.3 m) wide. These "service units" included a combined back-to-back prefabricated kitchen that backed onto a prebuilt bathroom, so water pipes, waste pipes and electrical distribution were all in the same place, and hence easy to install. The house retained a coal-fire, with a back boiler to create both central heating and a constant supply of hot water. Thus it had a bathroom included a flushing toilet and man-sized bath with hot running water. In the kitchen were a built-in oven, refrigerator and baxi water heater. All prefabs under the housing act came pre-decorated in magnolia, with gloss-green on all additional wood, including the door trimmings and skirting boards.

=== Pre-cast reinforced concrete ===
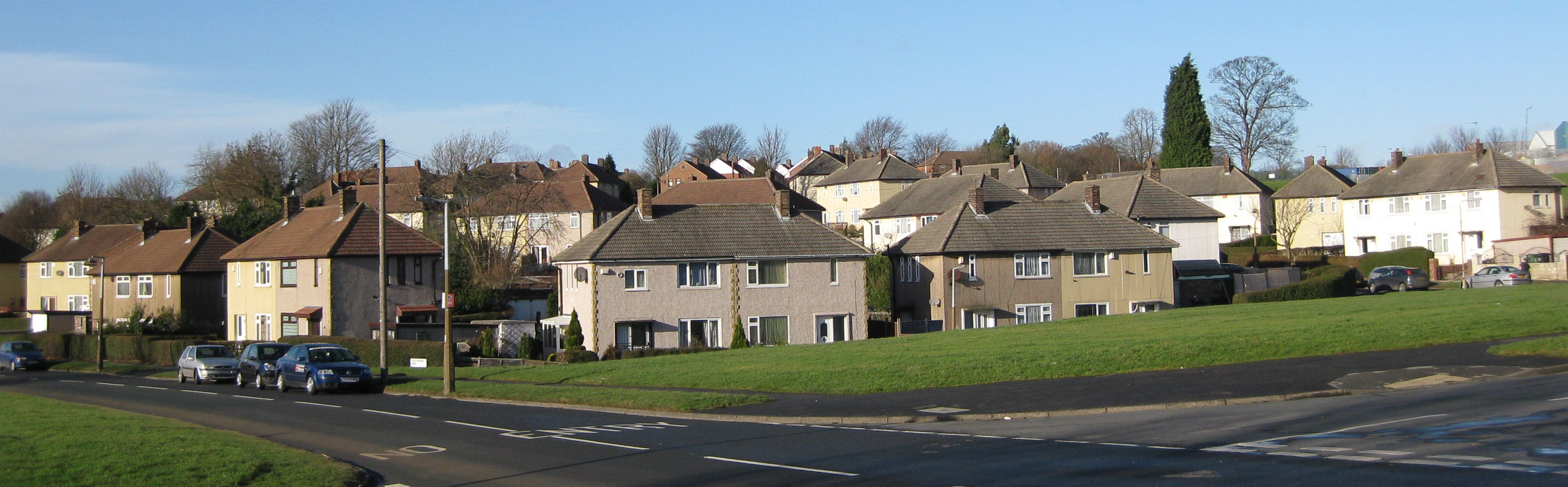
1950s semi-detached PRC houses in Seacroft, Leeds, West Yorkshire

=== Parker Morris homes ===
The Parker Morris Committee drew up an influential 1961 report on housing space standards in public housing in the United Kingdom titled Homes for Today and Tomorrow. The report concluded that the quality of social housing needed to be improved to match the rise in living standards. Out of the report came the Parker Morris Standards. In 1963 these were set out in the Ministry of Housing's "Design Bulletin 6 – Space in the Home". They became mandatory for all council houses from 1967 until 1980. Among the Parker Morris standards were the requirements saying that:

- In one-, two- and three-bedroom dwellings, one flushing toilet is required, and it may be in the bathroom.
- A semi-detached or end-of-terrace house for four people should have a net floor area of 72 m^{2}.
- A dwelling for three or more people should have enclosed storage space for the kitchen of 2.3 cubic metres.
- Dwellings should be fitted with heating systems that maintain the kitchen and circulation space at 13 °C, and the living and dining spaces at 18 °C, when the external temperature is -1 °C.

=== Tower blocks ===
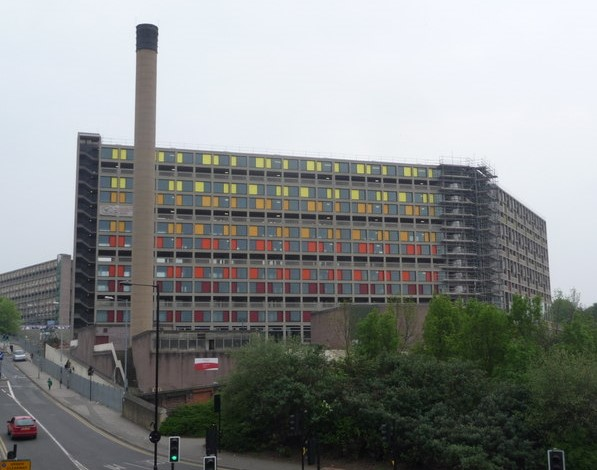
Park Hill in Sheffield, built in the 1950-60s and refurbished in the 2010s.

Particularly in larger cities, councils built high-rise blocks from the 1960s to the 1980s to accommodate a high density of dwellings at relatively low cost. Notable schemes include Park Hill in Sheffield, Hulme Crescents in Manchester, Cottingley in Leeds, Churchill Gardens in London, and many examples in Glasgow.

=== Radburn Style Estates 1970s ===
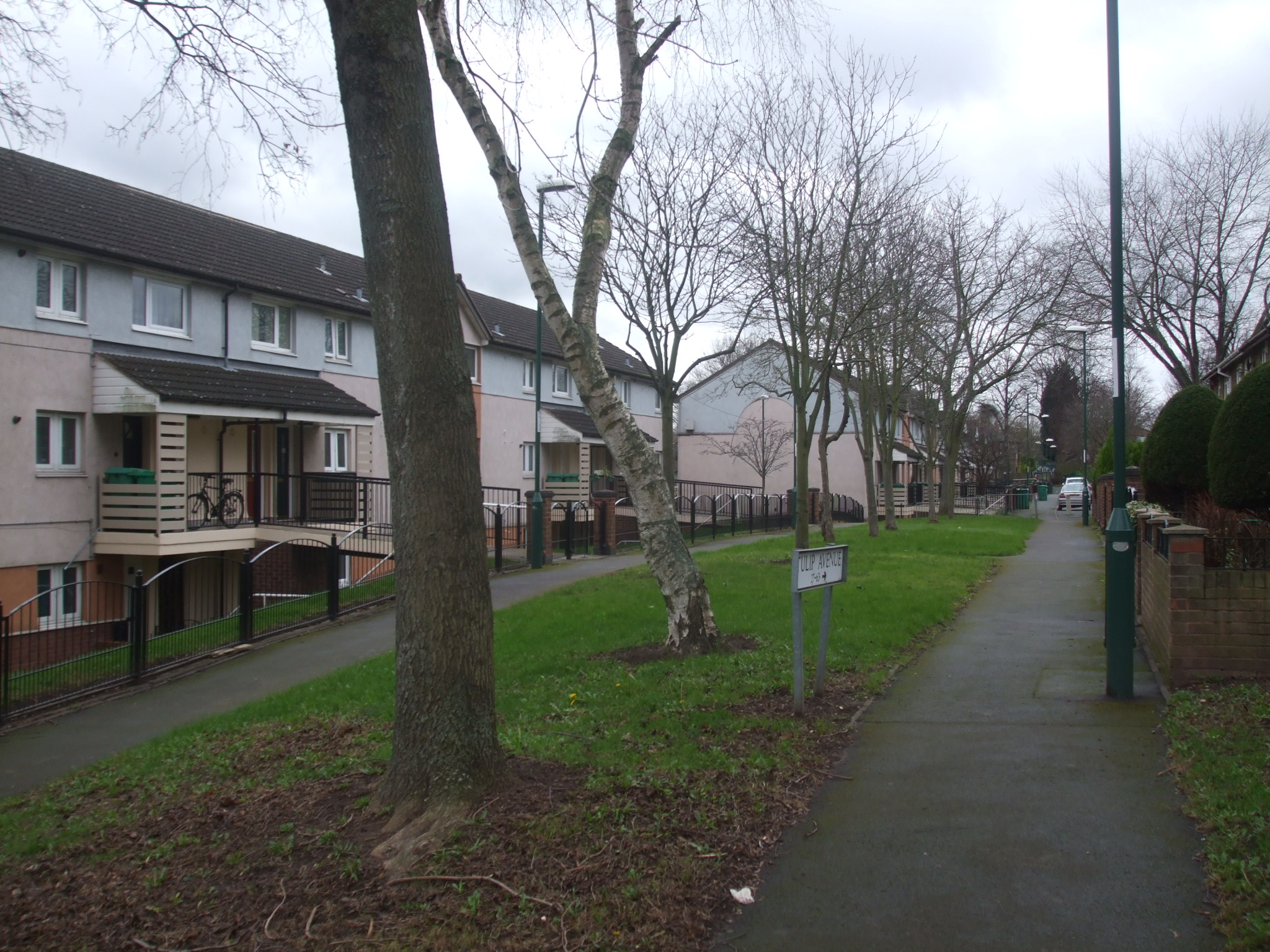
The Radburn layout. Maisonettes on Teak Avenue, on the St Ann's estate, Nottingham. The facing houses are on Tulip Avenue, Nottingham. The upper houses are accessed from this walkway, while car access is limited to the crossing roads.

The Radburn housing layout that aimed to separate cars from housing was used extensively in new towns. As a result, the houses are accessible to the front only by footpaths. This has created areas with poor surveillance, particularly over car parking at the rear, which have become the focus of crime. In Skelmersdale, tenants are calling for their Radburn style housing to be remodelled so that defensible space is created with parking close to their homes and a reduction in general use areas which give rise to anti-social behaviour.

=== 21st century revival ===
There was a revival in council housebuilding in the 2010s, with a focus on energy efficiency. Schemes such as Accordia in Cambridge and Goldsmith Street in Norwich have won awards. In London, space standards have been reintroduced via the London Plan, and councils including Southwark and Hounslow are building thousands of new council houses.

== Criticism ==
Beginning in the 1970s with Thatcherism, the housing sector witnessed public expenditure cutbacks, along with cutbacks in other public sectors like health and education, yet more extreme than those. This retrenchment from public housing was justified by a preference for a private housing market, or for commodification over public goods, and by the popularity of the critical description of council houses as a 'sink estate'. "Sink estates" were criticized as "cut off from society's mainstream" with "self-inflicted poverty stemming from...the dead weight of low expectations." In the immediate years of the post-war era, the role of the state in the sector existed as providers of public housing aimed at a broad range of households. This changed starting from the 1970s, with social housing entering the mainstream. Social housing emphasizes the 'safety net' characteristic in that it is only for those whose needs are not met in the market. The transformation of the sector from a public housing as serving a wide range of households with different incomes to a stigmatised social housing model is a direct result of government policies and their portrayal of council houses.

== Historical statistics on housing construction ==
Dwellings completed by local authorities, New Towns, and the Scottish Housing Association, 1945–80 (thousands)

Dwellings completed 1945–80
Year	England and Wales	Scotland
1945–50 (annual average)	96.3	14.3
1951–55 (annual average)	188.1	30.9
1956–60 (annual average)	124.4	25.9
1961	98.5	20.1
1962	111.7	19.0
1963	102.4	21.6
1964	126.1	29.5
1965	140.9	27.6
1966	142.4	28.2
1967	159.3	34.0
1968	148.0	33.3
1969	139.9	34.3
1970	134.9	34.4
1971	117.2	28.6
1972	93.6	19.6
1973	79.3	17.3
1974	99.4	16.2
1975	122.9	22.8
1976	124.2	21.2
1977	121.2	14.3
1978	96.8	9.9
1979	75.0	7.9
1980	77.1	7.0

== See also ==
- List of large council estates in the UK
- Public housing in the United Kingdom
- Affordable housing
- Subsidized housing
- Housing estate
- New Towns in the United Kingdom
- Gemeindebau
