= Winscombe Street =

Terrace of houses in London, England

Coordinates: 51.56272°N 0.14284°W

- Interactive map of the Winscombe Street area

General information
- Type: Terrace of five houses
- Location: Camden, London, England

Technical details
- Floor count: 3

Design and construction
- Architect: Neave Brown
- Designations: Grade II listed
- Known for: Precursor to the Dunboyne Road and Alexandra Road estates

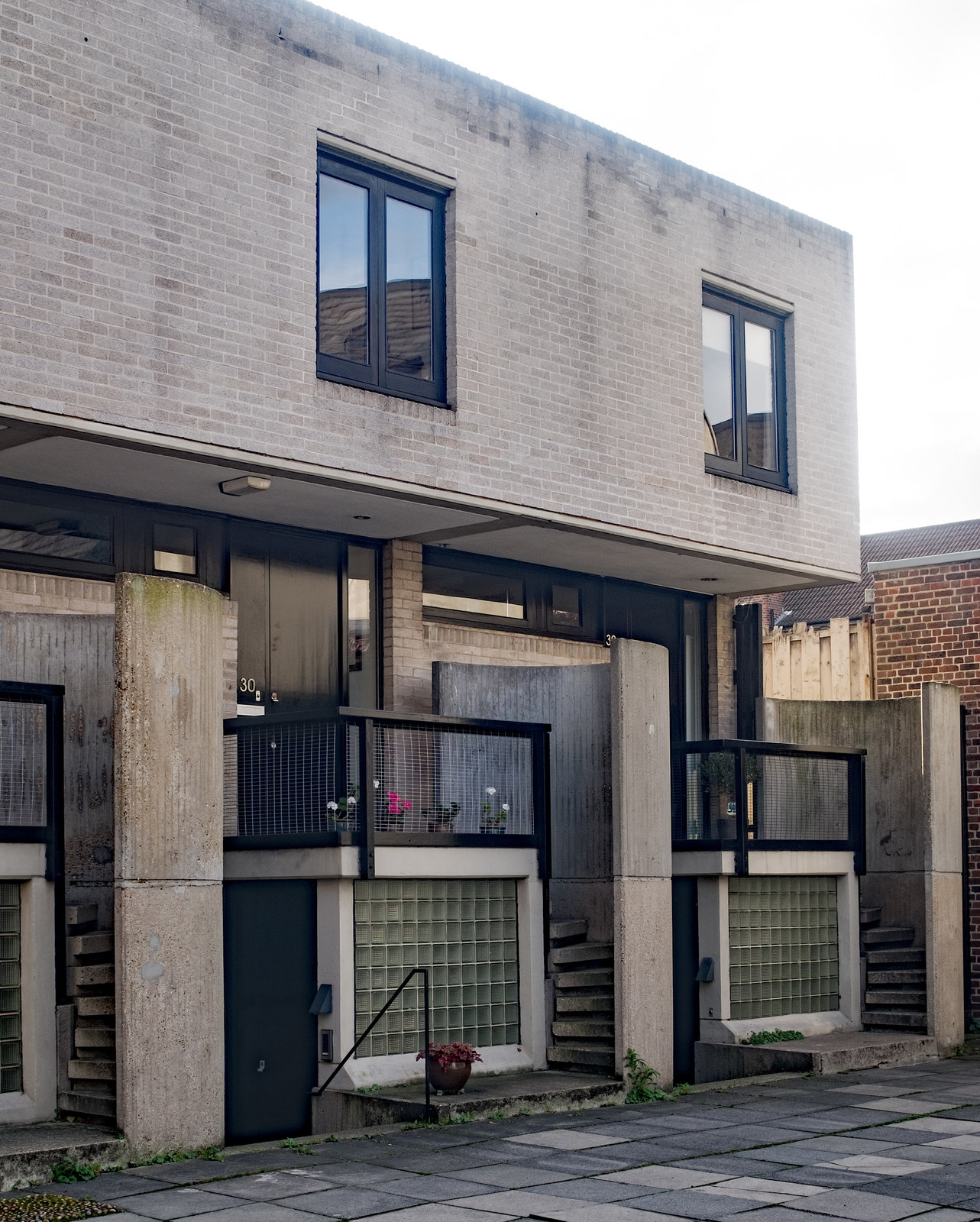
Housing terrace, Winscombe Street

Winscombe Street refers to a terrace of five houses in Camden, London, England, designed by the architect Neave Brown for himself and a collective of four other families. It is Grade II listed and was the precursor for the house and maisonette designs used in Dunboyne Road Estate and Alexandra Road Estate.

== Design ==
These are three-storey three bedroom houses designed to the Parker Morris space standards. In a 'contemporary house' the kitchen is the central room. Neave placed the kitchen on the middle floor, with a terrace and steps down to a shared garden. The children's bedrooms are placed below, and open directly through stable doors, which double as windows into the garden. The parents' bedroom and the living room are on the floor above — the living room looking out over the garden.
