= Peter Tábori =

Anglo-Hungarian architect (1940–2023)

- Born: 15 January 1940
- Died: 23 February 2023 (aged 83)
- Alma mater: University of Westminster
- Occupation: Architect

Peter Tábori (15 January 1940 – 23 February 2023) was a Hungarian-born British architect. He trained in London and is best known for the housing schemes he designed for the London Borough of Camden under Sydney Cook in the 1960s and 1970s, especially Highgate New Town (1968–1979).

== Education and early career ==
Tábori was born Péter Stroh in Budapest, Hungary on 15 January 1940, to Erzsébet (née Szántó), an opera singer, and her husband István Stroh, a professor of mathematics. Erzsébet subsequently remarried, to an economist Michael Tábori.

Peter Tábori came to Britain in 1956, with his mother and Michael Tábori, after being imprisoned for six months following the Russian invasion of 1956. He formally adopted the name Tábori when he became a British citizen in 1966.

In Britain he finished his schooling and worked for a year for the architect Cecil Epril (1897–1982) before starting his architecture training at Regent Street Polytechnic, London (1958).

At the end of his first year Tábori won a travel scholarship, which he used to travel in northern Italy, visiting Siena, Florence and Pisa. At the end of his second year at the suggestion of James Stirling he took a year's break and applied to fellow Hungarian Ernő Goldfinger, where he worked for two years. Tábori returned to Regent Street and then went back to Goldfinger for his official 'year out'. Goldfinger was a lasting influence on Tábori's interest in pre-modernist buildings and form.

Tábori returned to Regent Street for his fourth year (1963–64) where tutor Richard Rogers, freshly returned from the US, stimulated Tábori's interest in housing. Inspired by Rogers' enthusiasm for mass production, Tábori, for his fifth year thesis, decided to explore industrialised housing typologies. By this stage, Rogers had given up teaching, to concentrate on Team 4, but informally he continued to mentor Tábori and recommended he should incorporate some real sites and briefs. Tábori contacted Hampstead (the forerunner of Camden) and was sent information on three sites, including Highgate New Town. His thesis looked at vertical facades with hung balconies and was not the origin of his stepped-section design for Highgate New Town. Italian-born Rogers encouraged Tábori to draw on his experience from visiting Italy's hill towns, which featured terraces and external stairs. Tábori was also influenced by Rogers’ interest in environmental design, which became evident at Highgate New Town – one of the first times that ‘ecological’ principles were applied to British council housing.

== Later career ==
The external examiner for Tábori's fifth-year thesis was Denys Lasdun, who promptly offered Tábori a position in his office. Tábori stayed with Denys Lasdun & Partners for three years (1965–68), working on the University of East Anglia, including the terraced ziggurat-like halls of residence and spending five months on the details of the pre-cast concrete with engineers Ove Arup – an experience that he would put to good use at Highgate New Town.

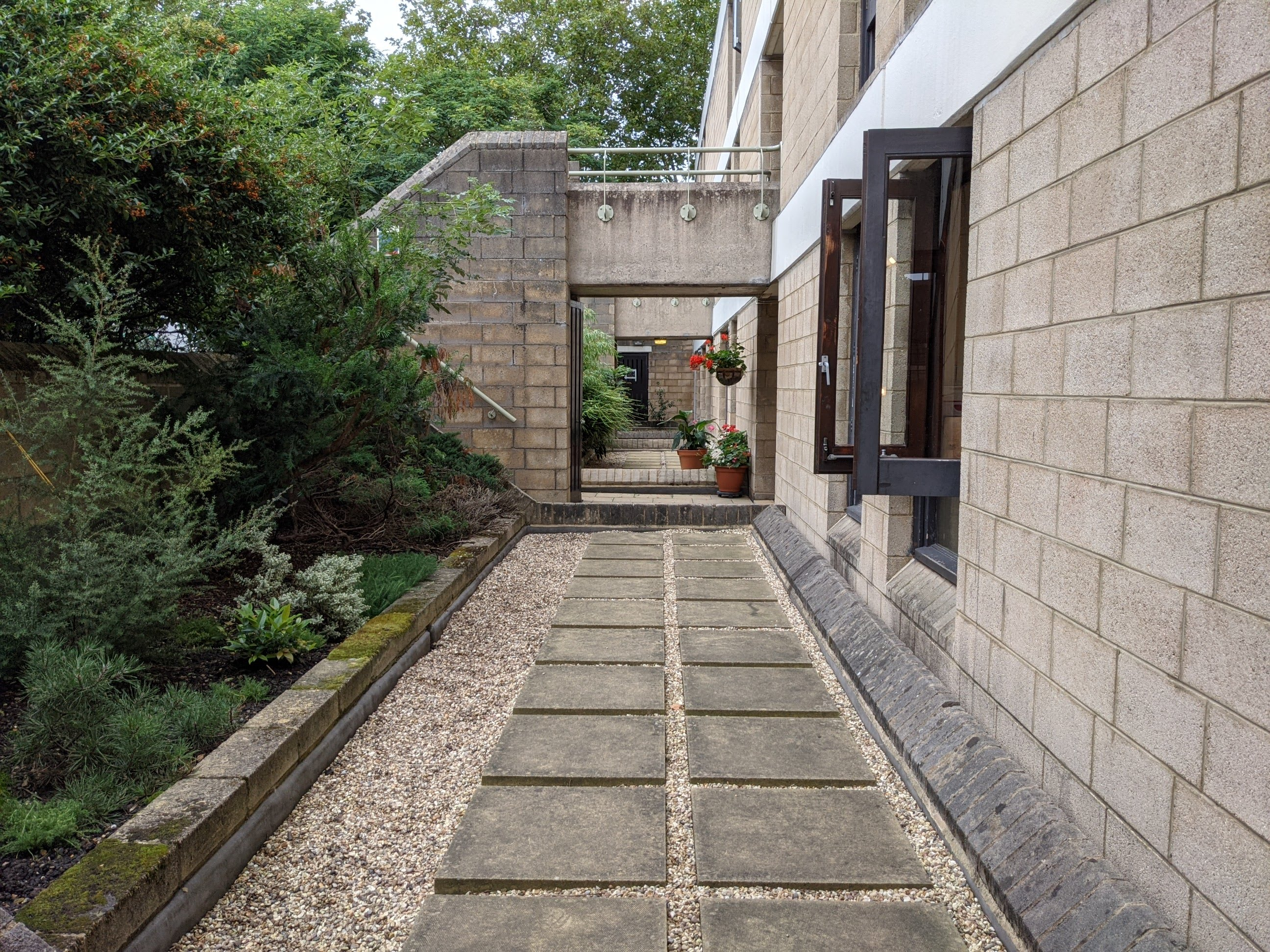
Detail of Highgate New Town

While still working for Denys Lasdun, in the autumn of 1967 Tábori was invited by Camden's borough architect Sydney Cook to attend an informal interview. For Tábori the primary attraction of Camden was Neave Brown, whose radical low-rise design for Fleet Road (Dunboyne Road Estate) accompanied by the text, ‘The form of housing’, had just been published in Architectural Design magazine. Highgate New Town is the best known of Tabori's Camden housing schemes and at the time was widely published in the UK, as well as France and Japan. But it was not the only one; Tabori was also asked by Cook to produce a design for another site, in Polygon Road, close to St Pancras Station. The design for this (now known as Oakshott Court) was closely related to Highgate New Town but with the terraced blocks in a L-shape formation. Due to pressure of work, delivery of the scheme was given to outside architects (first Roman Halter and then James Gowan) who made a number of changes (including red brick facing instead of concrete) without affecting the fundamentals of the design. The scheme was published extensively in the UK and also in Japan.

While Highgate New Town was under construction, Tábori designed a third housing scheme, for a corner site at the junction of Mill Lane and Solent Road, which was eventually completed in 1981. Similarities included a stepped section and striking external staircases cascading down the façade.

Tábori's work at Camden also included the redevelopment of railway lands, which constituted a large proportion of the potential sites in the borough. In 1974-75 he worked with Ove Arup on a borough-wide land-use and planning study, ‘The Adaptability of Railway Land in Camden’, looking at the feasibility of decking over railway lines at various locations for housing and other uses. He then produced (to detailed design stage) a scheme for decking over South Hampstead station, including 400 dwellings, shops and a sports centre (1975–77) and another for Hampstead Heath station (900 dwellings) (1977–79). Following serious injuries sustained in a car accident and other major health issues, Tábori was eventually forced by ill health to leave Camden in the 1980s and focused on private work.

With the revival of interest in the low-rise high-density format developed at Camden, Highgate New Town received renewed attention in the early 21st century, notably from Mark Swenarton (2017) who documented Tábori's work for the first time, but also from David Levitt and Jo McCafferty, and Mike Althorpe and Abigail Batchelor.

== Personal life ==
Tábori married twice; firstly in 1962 to Angelika Schiel (died 2016), a model and subsequently an upholsterer, with whom he had three sons. They divorced circa 1980. Secondly to Anne Saville, a welfare adviser with Gingerbread, and with whom he had another son in 1984; they later separated.

== Death ==
Tábori died on 23 February 2023, at the age of 83, survived by his sons.
