= Parkfield House =

Municipal building in Middleton, Greater Manchester, England

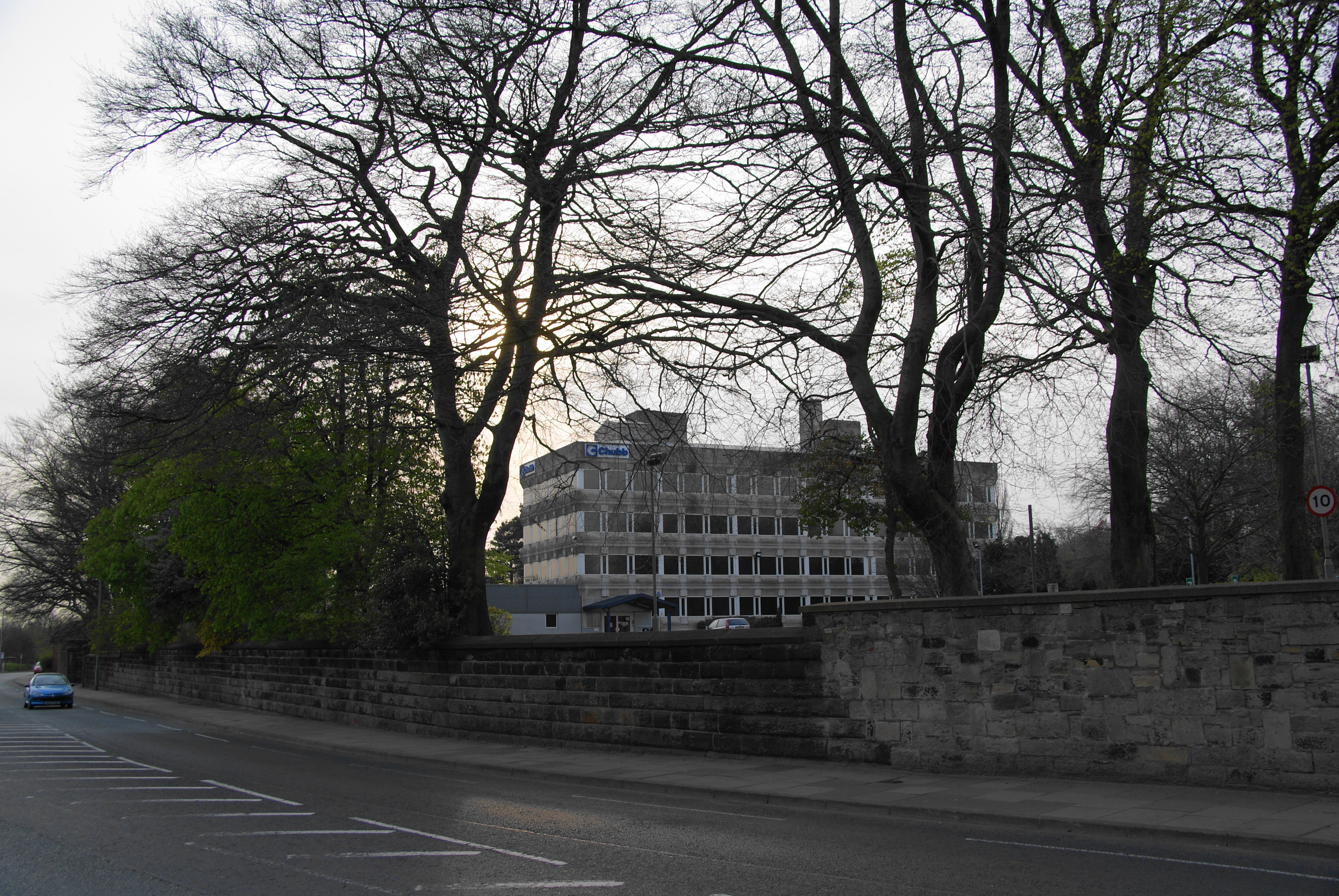
- The building in 2010

- Shown in Greater Manchester
- 53.5465°N 2.2090°W
- Location: Manchester Old Road, Middleton

History
- Built: 1965

Site notes
- Architect: Tom Ellis of Lyons Israel Ellis
- Architectural style: Brutalist style

Parkfield House, formerly known as Middleton Town Hall, is a former municipal building in Manchester Old Road, Middleton, a town in Greater Manchester in England. The building, which served as the offices and meeting place of Middleton Borough Council, is currently vacant.

== History ==
The original Parkfield House was commissioned by a local magistrate, Thomas Ashton, in the first half of the 19th century. The site he selected was on the north side of the Manchester Old Road opposite the entrance to Alkrington Park Road. It was designed in the Georgian style, built in ashlar stone and was Ashton's main residence by 1848. It was acquired by another local magistrate, Harvey Heywood, in around 1870.

In 1886, the local area became a municipal borough and the local improvement commissioners were succeeded by Middleton Borough Council. Heywood became the first mayor of the new borough council, which was initially based at the old town hall in Gas Street. After Heywood died in 1920, his widow, Harriette, sold the original Parkfield House to Middleton Borough Council for use as its headquarters in 1925.

A garden of remembrance with a colonnade was established on the west side of the original house in the presence of Lieutenant Colonel Roderick Livingstone Lees of the 6th Battalion, Lancashire Fusiliers in October 1927.

As the responsibilities of the borough council increased, councillors decided to commission a more substantial building on a site between the garden of remembrance (on the left) and the original building (on the right). The new four-storey building was designed by Tom Ellis of Lyons Israel Ellis in the brutalist style with an L-shaped plan, built in concrete and glass, and was completed in 1965. It continued to serve as the headquarters of the borough council for the next decade, but ceased to be the local seat of government when the enlarged Rochdale Borough Council was formed in 1974. The council instructed the demolition of the original Parkfield House in 1978.

In 1980, the council sold the newer building to the North West Water Authority, which sold it on to the security business, Chubb, in 2000. Chubb vacated the building in 2020. In January 2023, the developer, Muller Property Group, acquired the vacant building, and, in May 2023, Muller Property Group submitted plans to demolish the building and replace it with 20 houses and an 80-bed care home.
