= David Wyn Roberts =

Welsh architect (1911–1982)

David Wyn Roberts (1911 in Cardiff, Wales – 8 November 1982) was a British architect and educator, who designed more university buildings for Cambridge University than any other architect. With a modernist practice based in Cambridge, he also designed many city housing projects, schools, and private residences.

== Early life ==
Roberts' father, John Roberts, was a preacher and historian of the Presbyterian Church of Wales. David Roberts was educated at the Cardiff High School and Welsh School of Architecture, and was awarded the 1936 RIBA Soane Medal.

David Roberts was commissioned as an officer in the Royal Engineers in August 1942 and he served in the Italian campaign.

Roberts married architect Margaret MacDonald Baird, and they settled in Cambridge where they built their house at 11 Wilberforce Road. Their only son, Nicholas Wyn Roberts, born in 1948, became an architect and professor of architecture at Woodbury University in Los Angeles.

== Career ==
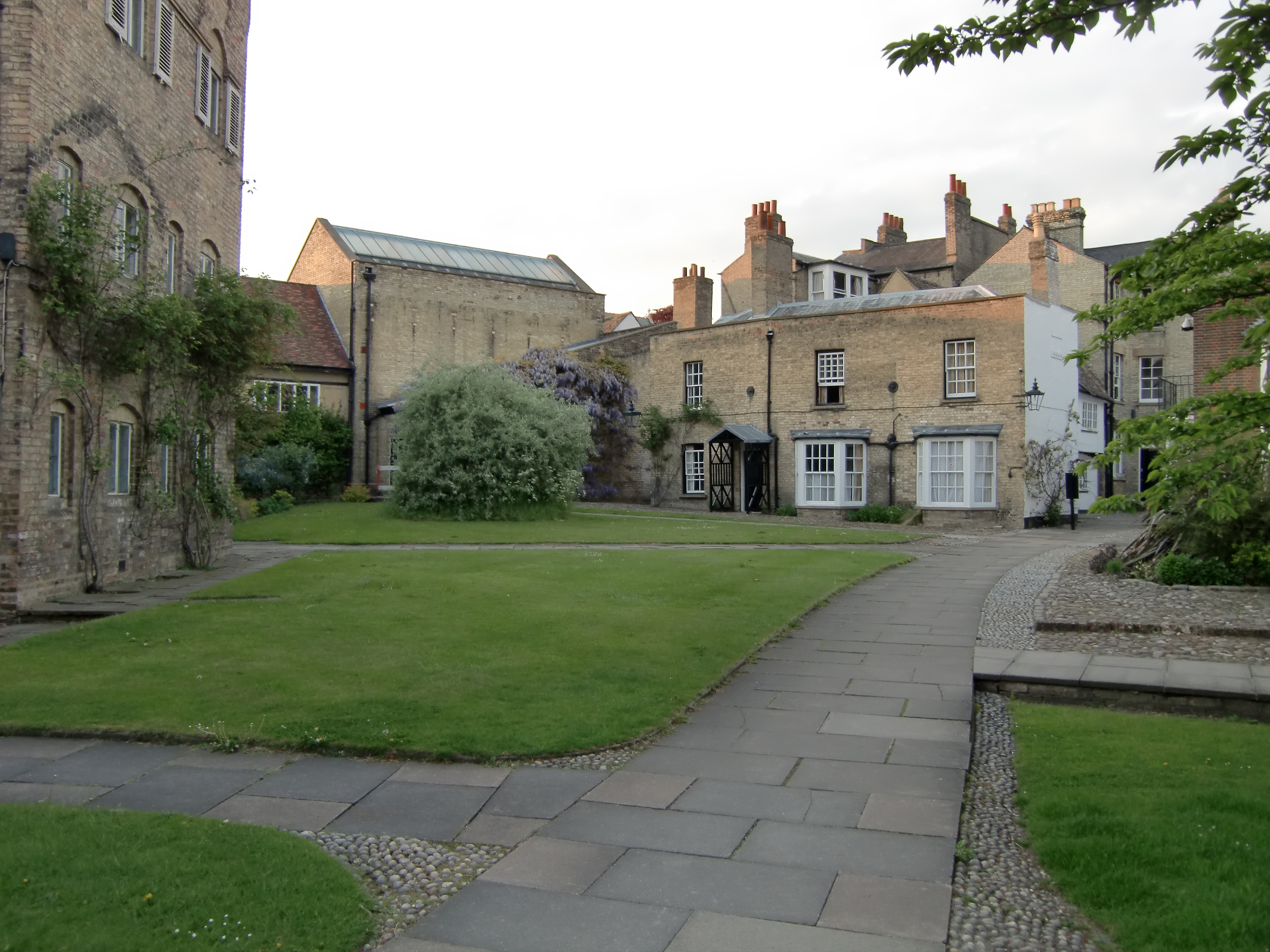
Mallory Court at Magdalene College, Cambridge

Roberts began teaching at the Department of Architecture, University of Cambridge in 1946, and became a fellow of Magdalene College, Cambridge in 1958. He influenced many students and employees who became scholars and architects, including Anthony Vidler, Lionel March, Nicholas Ray, Cedric Price, and John G. Ellis. Roberts was a modernist architect in postwar Cambridge with his University Health Centre built in 1951. Roberts's earliest college work was at Magdalene where, in Benson and Mallory Courts, he created a small townscape; he refurbished existing houses, and built new infill, to create a street effect, rather than imposing the conventional form of a college courtyard.

With his headquarters overlooking the Cam, Roberts kept his office small, six to eight people. Many young architects passed through the practice. Rory Spence wrote in the catalogue, David Roberts Architect, "He seemed to approach each job with fresh enthusiasm and great integrity. It is no wonder that he had such admiration for Philip Webb and the meticulous individual care which he lavished on each design. Like Webb, David never worked to a formula, as so many of even the best architects do, and possibly for this reason his buildings are less well-known than they should be. There is always a strong idea at the heart of each building, related to its context, which is unique to that building". A former student, Geoffrey Clarke, became a partner in 1964.

Roberts is described as the first architect to specialise in modern educational buildings. He gave a stepped profile to his designs for student accommodation (for example at Clare College in 1956 and Jesus College in 1963) to give the rooms a dual aspect. His student accommodation buildings at Jesus College, Cambridge and St Hugh's College, Oxford, have already been given a heritage listing of Grade II.

Roberts and his wife are buried together in the Ascension Parish Burial Ground in Cambridge.

== Notable works ==
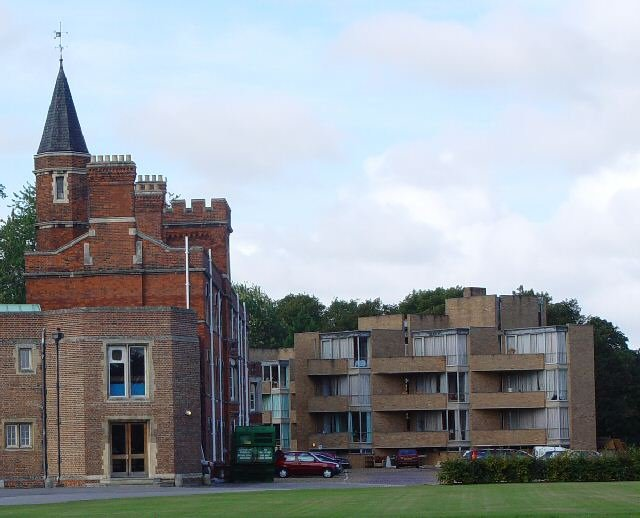
North Court, Jesus College, Cambridge

- University Health Centre, Gresham Road, Cambridge, 1949
- St Mary's Convent School, Bateman Road, Cambridge, 1955–1971
- River Building, Magdalene College, Cambridge, 1956
- Clare Hostel, Chesterton Lane, Cambridge, 1957
- Boathouse for Sidney Sussex College, Cambridge, 1957
- The Snowcat, Arbury Road, Cambridge, 1959
- Sacher Building, New College, Oxford, 1961
- St Bede's School, Birdwood Road, Cambridge, 1961
- Dominican Priory, Buckingham Road, Cambridge, 1961
- North Court, Jesus College, Cambridge, 1963
- Fitzwilliam Museum, Trumpington Street, Cambridge, 1963
- Kenyon Building, St Hugh's College, Oxford, 1964 (now Grade II listed)
- Roscoe and Gladstone Halls of Residence, University of Liverpool, 1965
- Churchill College, Wolfson Flats, Cambridge, 1965
- St Hugh's College, Stage II, Oxford, 1966
- Cromwell Court, Sidney Sussex College, Cambridge, 1982

=== Collaboration with Geoffrey Clarke ===
- New Master's Lodge, Magdalene College, Cambridge, 1966
- East Road Development, Cambridge, 1968
- Buckingham Court, Magdalene College, Cambridge, 1968
- Cosin Court, Tennis Court Terrace, Cambridge, 1969
- Wolfson Court, Clarkson Road, Girton College, Cambridge, 1970
- Trinity Hall, Central Site Development, Cambridge, 1973
- Fitzwilliam Museum, Stage II, Cambridge, 1973
- Burrell's Field, Grange Road, Cambridge, 1976
- Darwin College, Silver Street, Cambridge, 1977
- Rose Crescent Shops, Rose Crescent, Cambridge, 1979
