= Alan Colquhoun =

English architect, historian, critic and teacher (1921–2012)

Alan Harold Colquhoun (27 June 1921 – 13 December 2012) was an English architect, historian, critic and teacher.

== Biography ==
Colquhoun was born in Eton, Buckinghamshire on 27 June 1921 and attended Bradfield School. He went on to study architecture at the Edinburgh College of Art and the Architectural Association in London. In the Second World War Colquhoun was a captain in the Bengal Sappers and Miners, at Roorkee, India, where he first met future friend and architectural colleague Robert Maxwell. Colquhoun started his career as an architect at London County Council (LCC), and then in the practice of Lyons Israel Ellis where he designed the Bridgnorth Girls' School in Bridgnorth Shropshire, now listed Grade II.

== Work ==
In 1961 Colquhoun co-founded the architectural practice Miller and Colquhoun, remaining a partner until 1989. Highlight of their buildings are a noted refurbishment of Whitechapel Art Gallery in London, Forest Gate High School, the Chemistry Building of Royal Holloway College in Surrey, and several houses and housing schemes in London.

Colquhoun taught at the Architectural Association School of Architecture from 1957 to 1964 and at the Polytechnic of Central London (now University of Westminster) in the mid seventies. He was appointed as a professor at Princeton University School of Architecture in 1981, becoming Professor Emeritus in 1991. He also was a visiting professor at Cornell in 1969, and at Harvard University, Cambridge University, L'Ecole Polytechnique Federale de Lausanne, and Trinity College, Dublin. He died in London on 13 December 2012.

A biography of Colquhoun was published in 2012: Alan Colquhoun : architect, historicus, criticus = architect, historian, critic. by Tom Avermaete; Christoph Grafe; Hans Teerds.

== Publications ==
- Essays in Architectural Criticism: Modern Architecture and Historical Change (Oppositions Books, 1985) According to WorldCat, the book is held in 531 libraries It has been translated into French by Michèle Osborn, and also into Turkish, Italian, Catalan, Spanish and Finnish.
- Colquhoun, Miller and Partners - Architects by Alan Colquhoun and John Miller (1988) New York:Rizzoli. According to WorldCat, the book is held in 188 libraries It has been translated into French by as
- Modernity and the Classical Tradition: Architectural Essays, 1980-87 MIT Press, 1991. According to WorldCat, the book is held in 448 libraries
- Modern Architecture (Oxford History of Art, 2002) According to WorldCat, the book is held in 1021 libraries It has been translated into French by Alan Colquhoun as L'architecture moderne. and into Spanish by Jorge Sainz as La arquitectura moderna : una historia desapasionada

He also published works on the architects Michael Graves and on Rafael Moneo and the sculptor Celia Scott.
