= Tom Ellis (architect) =

- Tom Ellis
- Born: December 1911; Lancaster
- Died: March 1988 (aged 76); London
- Occupation: Architect
- Practice: Lyons Israel and Ellis
- Buildings: Old Vic Annex; Bridgnorth School; Wolfson Institute Hammersmith Hospital; School of Engineering and Science

Thomas Bickerstaff Harper Ellis (December 1911 – March 1988) was a senior partner in the architectural firm Lyons, Israel and Ellis. The work of Ellis and his partners is noteworthy for both the collection of buildings they designed and for their influence on the group of architects who worked for the partnership. When English Heritage listed one of their buildings in 2006 they described the Lyons, Israel and Ellis partnership as 'one of the most influential post-war practices specialising in education, public housing and healthcare'.

The list of architects who worked for Lyons, Israel and Ellis includes James Stirling, Richard MacCormac, Rick Mather, James Gowan, John Miller, Neave Brown, Eldred Evans, Alan Colquhoun, David Gray and many others. David Gray became a partner in the firm in 1970 and the firm's name was changed to Lyons Israel Ellis Gray.

== Early life and education ==
Thomas Bickerstaff Harper Ellis was born in Lancaster in 1911. After attending Lancaster Technical School he was employed in 1929 as an assistant in the Lancaster office of the gardener and architect Thomas Hayton Mawson. During this period he also studied part-time at Lancaster School of Arts and Crafts where his academic work won him a Royal Exhibition (type of scholarship). With the help of this and a Lancashire County scholarship Ellis became a student at the Architectural Association in London (1934–35). A year later he moved to the Royal College of Art and obtained his final architectural qualification in 1938.

== Career ==
After qualifying Ellis worked in the architectural office of Vincent Harris in London and also taught in evening studio classes in the Regent Street Polytechnic. He volunteered for the army in 1940, rising from private to major. Much of Ellis's early architectural experience was obtained during this wartime period in the Royal Engineers. He was stationed in Cairo where he became Chief Works Design Officer designing hospitals and a variety of other military buildings.

After the war, Ellis worked on a number of hospital projects in Newcastle upon Tyne, including the masterplan for the Royal Victoria Infirmary. He also taught architecture at Durham University where his students included Alison and Peter Smithson. In 1947 he was invited to join Edward Lyons and Lawrence Israel in their partnership. Lyons and Israel had been working together since 1932 and Ellis had first met them before the war.

Between 1947 and 1984 when the partnership ceased, they designed over 60 buildings, mainly schools. The firm's offices were located in Portland Place London close to the RIBA. They employed 56 associates and assistants over the years, many of whom went on to set up their own practices (for example James Stirling and James Gowan).

In 1963 Ellis was elected a Fellow of the Royal Institute of British Architects. Several of his buildings have now been listed by English Heritage, the first being the Old Vic Theatre Annex.

== Notable projects ==
- 1957 Trescobeas County Secondary School, Trescobeas Road, Falmouth, Cornwall (now called Falmouth School)
- 1958 Old Vic Theatre Annex, The Cut, Southwark, London (now called Royal National Theatre Studio)
- 1960 Bridgnorth Girls' Secondary Modern School, Shropshire (now called Oldbury Wells School)
- 1961 The Wolfson Institute for the Royal Postgraduate Medical School, Du Cane Road, Hammersmith, London
- 1962 Upholland Mixed Secondary School, Sandbrook Road, Orrell, Lancashire (now called Up Holland High School)
- 1965 David Lister Higher School, Rustenburg Street, Kingston-upon-Hull (renamed David Lister School)
- 1966 Commonwealth Building for the Royal Postgraduate Medical School, Du Cane Road, Hammersmith, London
- 1966 Middleton Council Offices, Manchester Old Road, Middleton, Lancashire (now called Parkfield House)
- 1970 College of Engineering and Science, Polytechnic of Central London, New Cavendish Street, London (now part of the University of Westminster)

The work of Tom Ellis and his partners is well catalogued in an Architectural Association publication called Lyons Israel Ellis Gray: Building Projects 1932–1983.

== Bibliography ==
- Lyons Israel Ellis Gray - Works ISBN 0904503968 This book by the Architectural Association was published in 1988. The name Gray was added to the firm's title when David Gray became a partner in 1970.
- Collection of photographs of buildings by Lyons Israel and Ellis taken by Iqbal Aalam.
- English Heritage media "Listing" notice for the Old Vic theatre workshop The building is now called the Royal National Theatre Studio
- Historic England. "Royal National Theatre Studio (1391540)". National Heritage List for England.
- Historic England. "Oldbury Wells School (West) (1254447)". National Heritage List for England. Formerly called Bridgnorth Secondary Modern School.
- Historic England. "Upholland School (1220214)". National Heritage List for England.
