= Dunboyne Road Estate =

Housing estate in Gospel Oak, London

Coordinates: 51.5524°N 0.1587°W

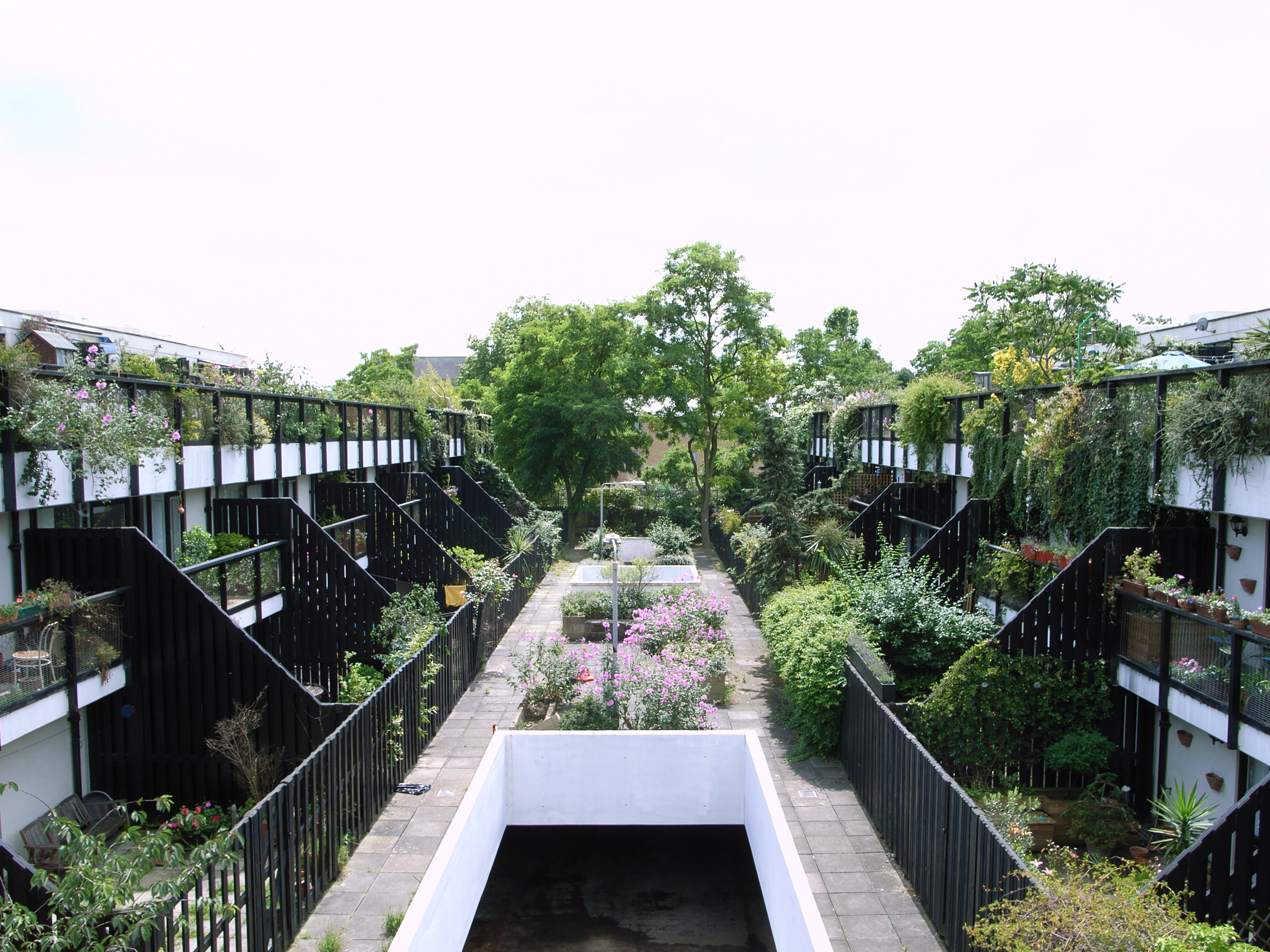
- Interactive map of Dunboyne Road Estate

General information
- Location: Gospel Oak
- No. of units: 71

Construction
- Constructed: 1967
- Architect: Neave Brown
- Style: Modernist
- Influence: Parker Morris Committee

The Dunboyne Road Estate previously known as the Fleet Road Estate is a Grade II-listed modernist estate, designed in Gospel Oak, London by Neave Brown in the late 1960s.

== Description ==
The scheme was designed by Neave Brown and the Camden Architects Department, it was the first application of the low-rise high-density housing scheme attached to public building. Design work started in 1966, and the estate was built between 1971 and 1977. Dunboyne Road was an experiment where 71 houses, a shop, and a studio, were arranged in parallel terraced rows, in groups of eight or sixteen, following the split level principles that Brown had used in his small housing scheme in Winscombe Street. Each house had a large terrace which overlooked the communal gardens.

No 36 Dunboyne Road retains many of its original features. It is a split level two bedroomed maisonette. The sitting room and study are on the split level, with large sliding French windows leading onto a paved terrace. Details include: full storey height doors; a tiled concrete kitchen worktop with timber built in cupboards and drawers; stairs in a glazed stairwell and stairs between the split level living areas; the sliding partition between the living area and study allows the residents to configure their living space.

== See also ==
- Alexandra Road Estate
