= Burrell's Field =

Coordinates: 52.205°N 0.109°E

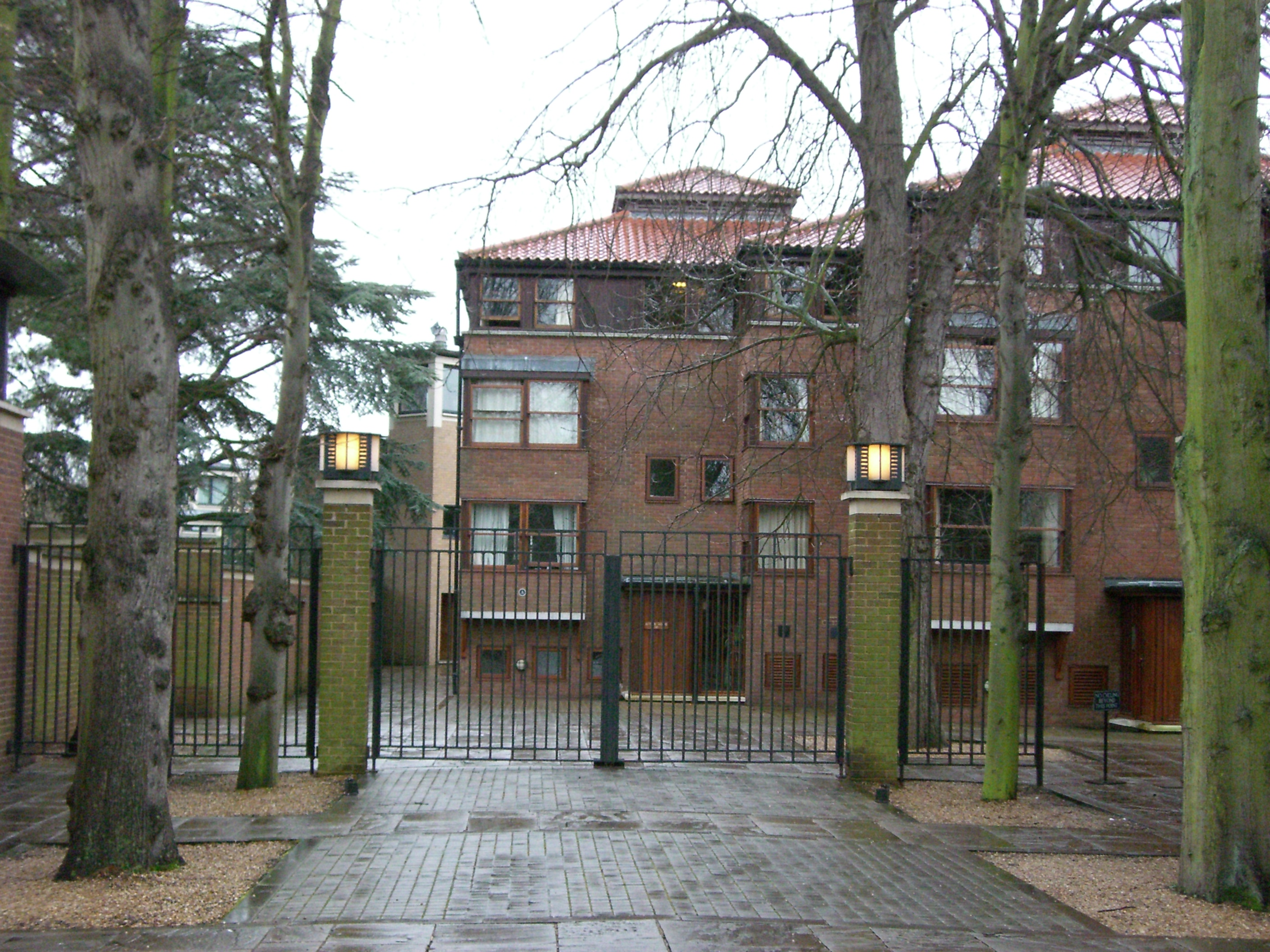
Main entrance to Burrell's Field, showing the lanterns that are shaped similarly to some of the buildings in Burrell's Field.

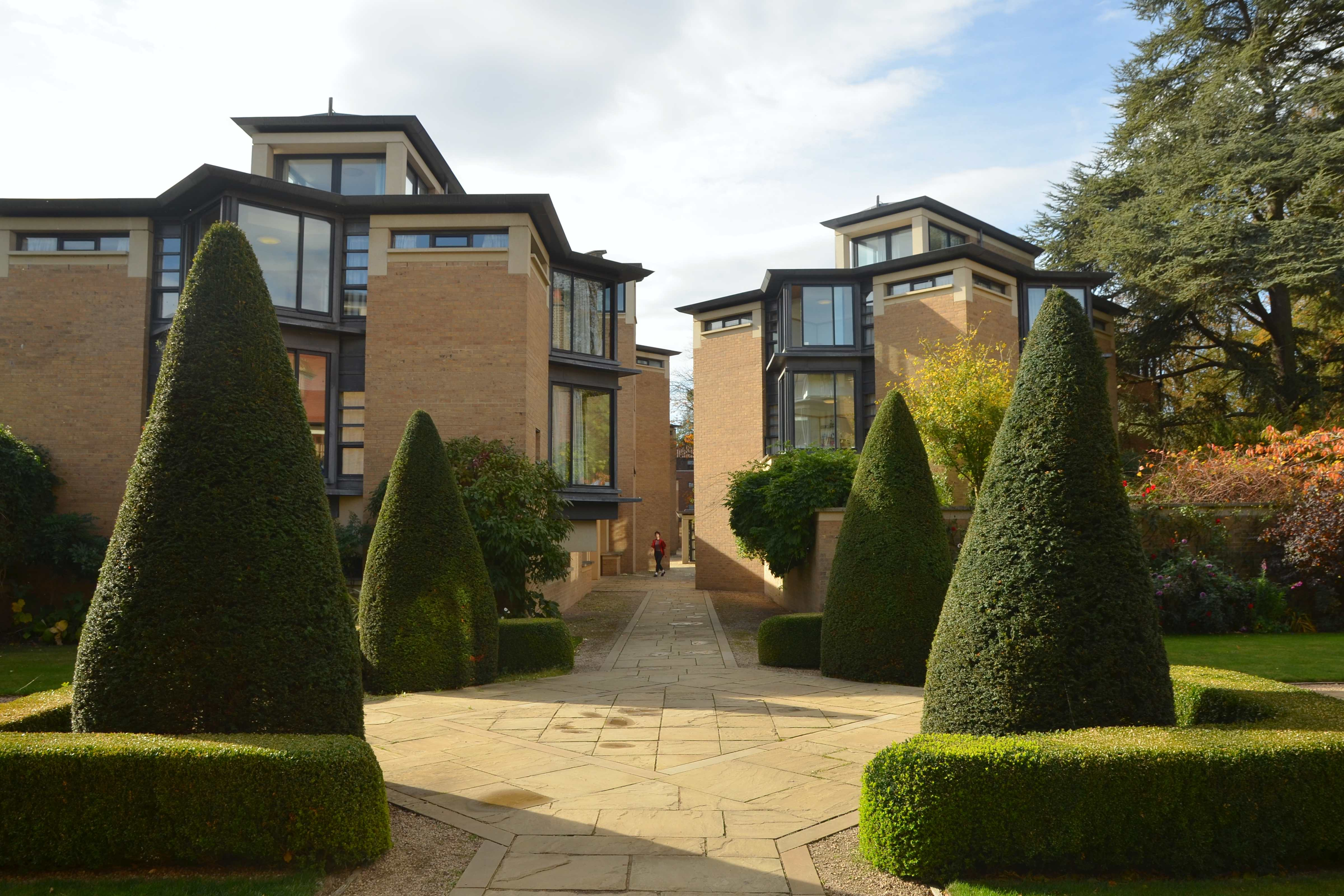
1995 development of Burrell's Field

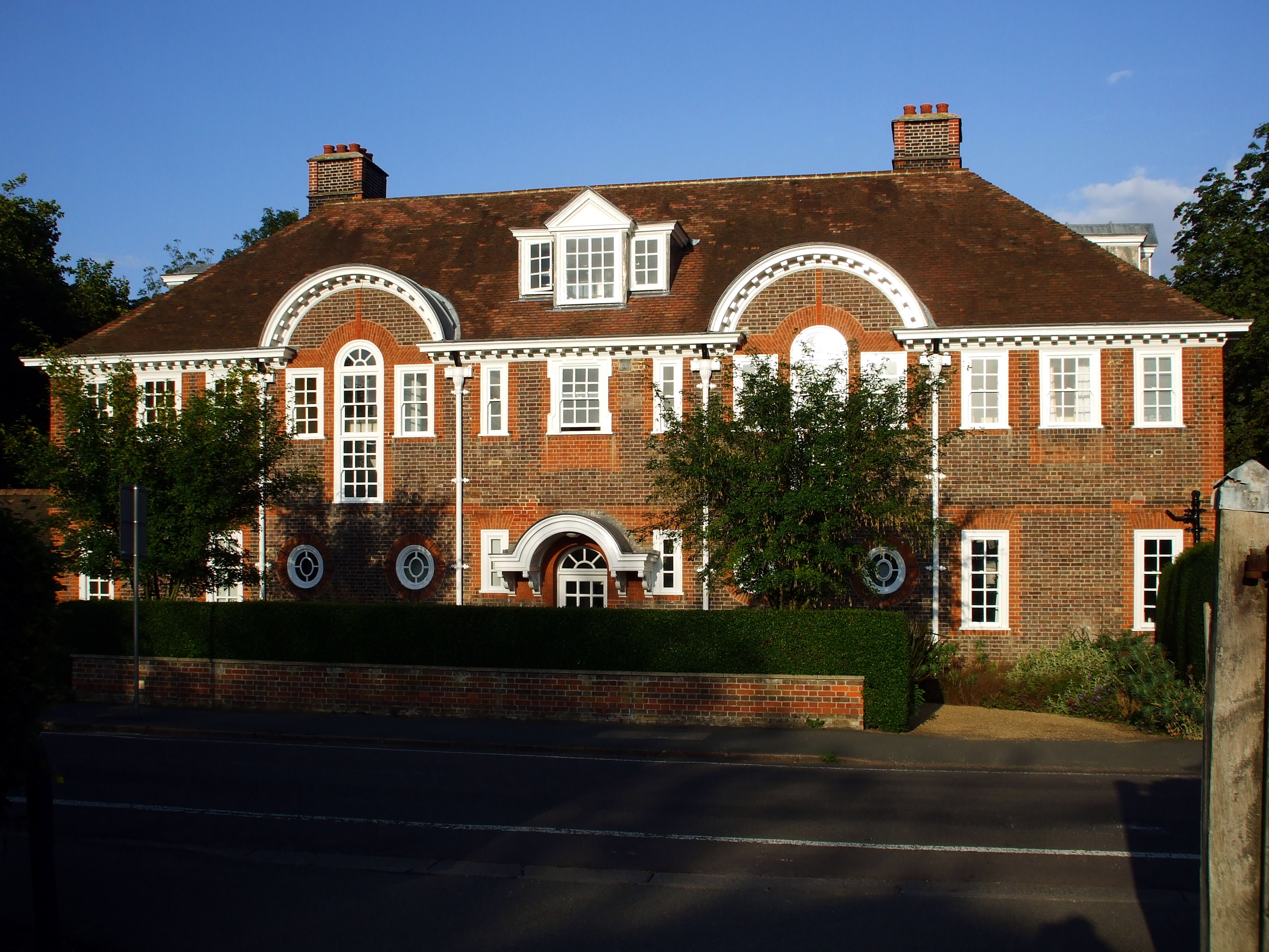
Whewell House (62 Grange Road)

Burrell's Field provides student accommodation as part of Trinity College, Cambridge, England. It is located between Queen's Road and Grange Road. It comprises three parts:

1. Four Edwardian houses, including Whewell House (built for L. F. L. Oppenheim, Whewell Professor of International Law, later home of Major-General Frederick Barton Maurice) and Silbury House.
2. Adrian House and Butler House, built in the 1970s;
3. A new development completed in 1995 by Sir Richard MacCormac of MJP Architects, and opened by the Queen. This complex provides accommodation for students and a small number of fellows, along with a common room and other amenities.

Although not built around courts, the newer buildings do follow Cambridge tradition in that all rooms are accessed via staircases rather than corridors.

Burrell's Field adjoins the Fellows' garden and is close to the University Library.
