= Lyons Israel Ellis =

American architectural and engineering firm

- Industry: Architecture
- Founded: (1934)
- Headquarters: London
- Area served: Great Britain
- Key people: Tom Ellis
- Services: Architecture

Lyons Israel Ellis was a British architectural firm. It was formed in 1934. The original partners were Edward Lyons and Lawrence Israel. Tom Ellis joined in 1947. The partnership closed in 1984.

The list of architects who worked for Lyons, Israel and Ellis includes James Stirling, Richard MacCormac, Rick Mather, James Gowan, John Miller, Neave Brown, Eldred Evans, Alan Colquhoun, David Gray and many others. David Gray became a partner in the firm in 1970 and the firm's name was changed to Lyons Israel Ellis Gray.
