= Whittington Estate =

Modernist housing estate in north central London

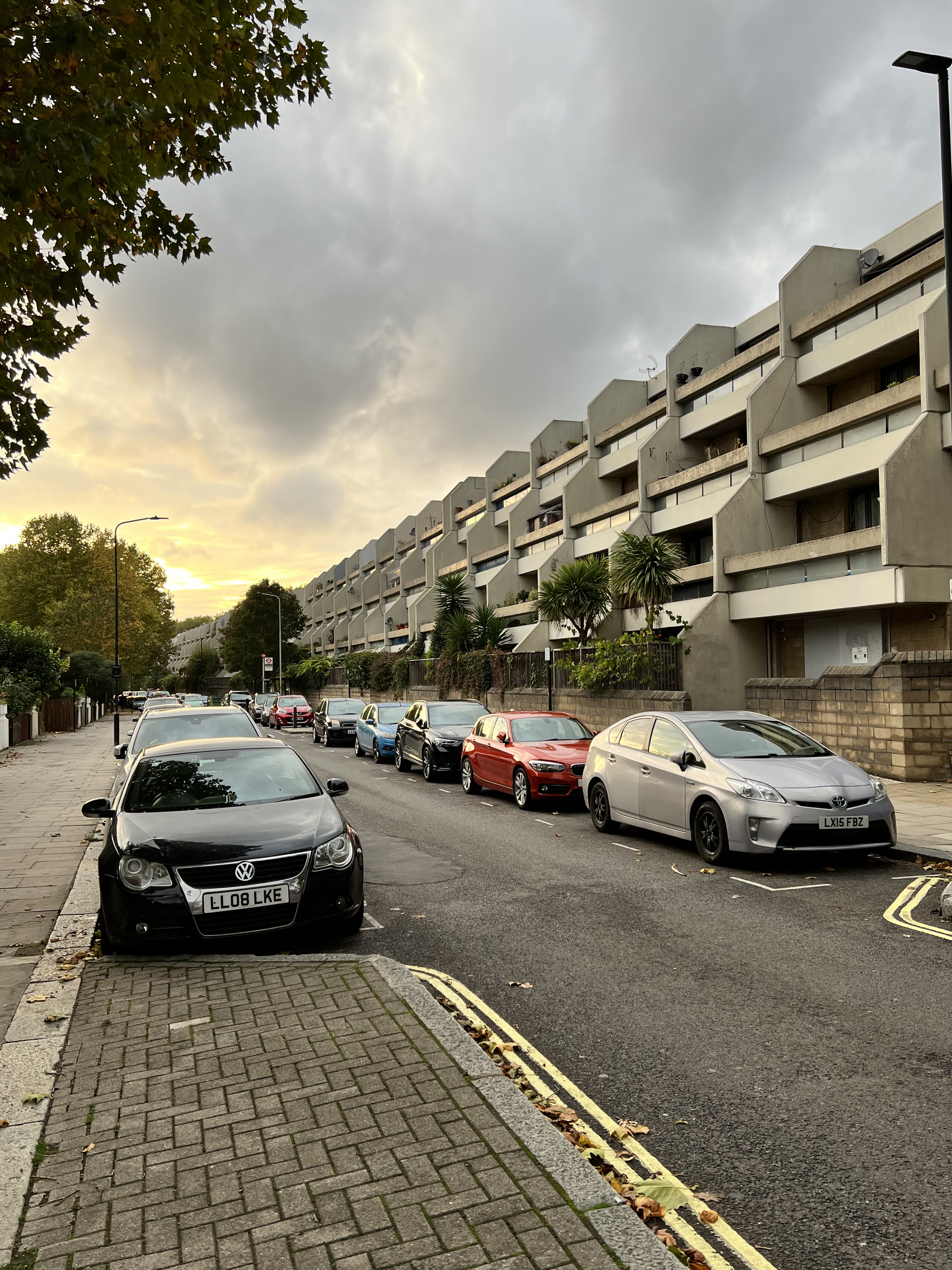
- View of Stoneleigh Terrace from Raydon Street
- Interactive map of Whittington Estate

General information
- Location: London Borough of Camden
- Coordinates: 51.5654878°N 0.1419120°W
- No. of units: 273

Construction
- Constructed: 1972–1979
- Architect: Peter Tábori
- Style: Modernism, Brutalism

The Whittington Estate, also known as Highgate New Town, is a housing estate in the London Borough of Camden, North London, England. It was designed in a modernist style by Peter Tábori and Ken Adie for Camden Council's Architects Department. Construction work commenced in 1972 and was completed in 1979, five years later than planned. The estate was designed by Tábori initially as his final year project at the Regents Street Polytechnic under the name Highgate New Town; Sydney Cook, the head of Camden Architects Department went on to commission Tábori to make the estate a reality.

== Description ==
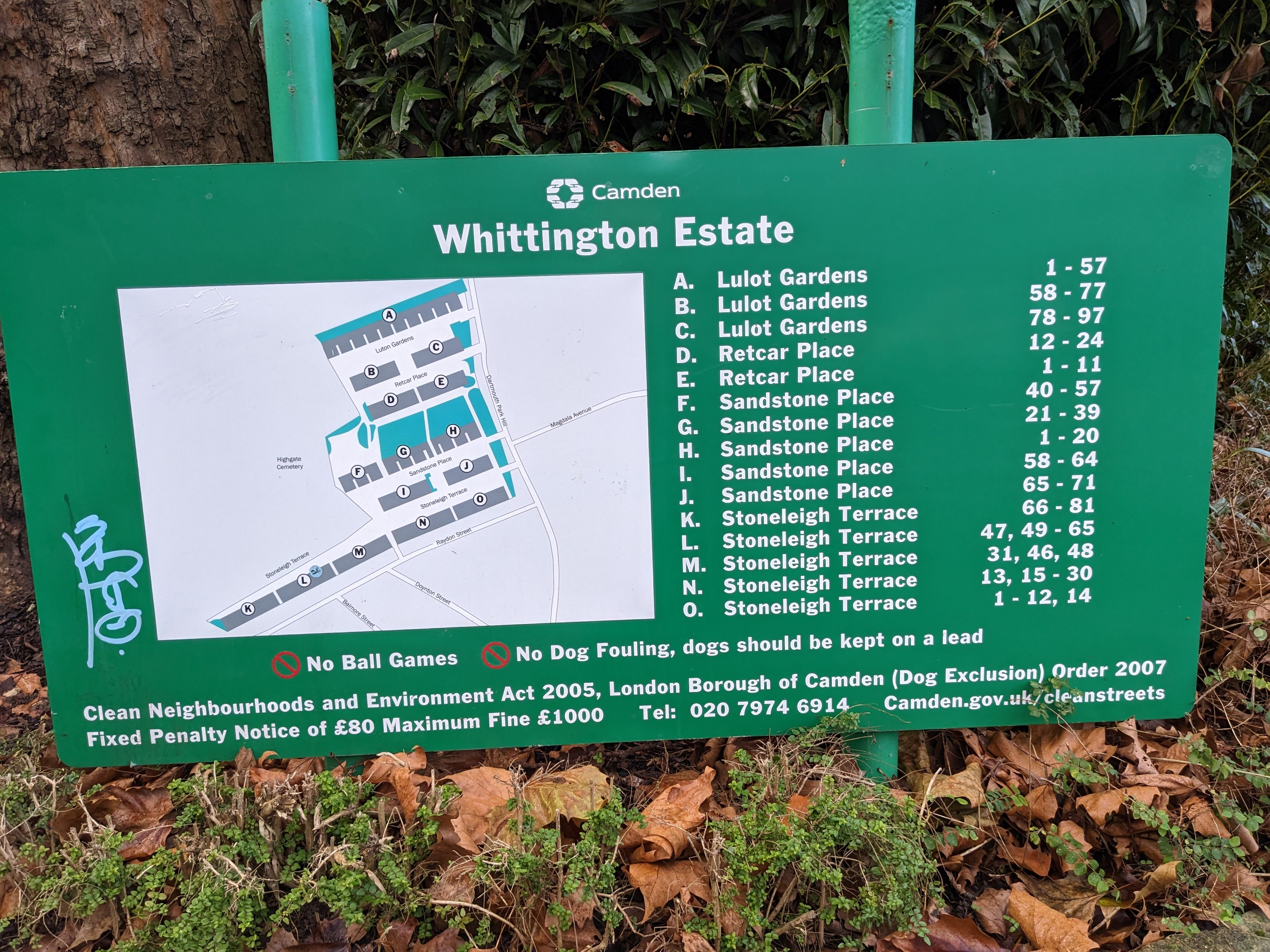
A map of the Whittington Estate

The estate comprises 6 parallel terraces with pedestrian streets running between; it is built primarily out of precast concrete with dark-stained timber used for the doors and windows. Camden Architects Department are famous for their application of low-rise high-density design for their housing estates under Sydney Cook in the 60s and 70s, the Whittington Estate being a prime example of this design principle. Flats are arranged in a ziggurat arrangement with south-facing balconies or terraces for each flat, giving each flat access to plentiful natural light. There is a small park, a sports pitch and a children's playground on the estate grounds as well as numerous planters containing greenery lining the streets.

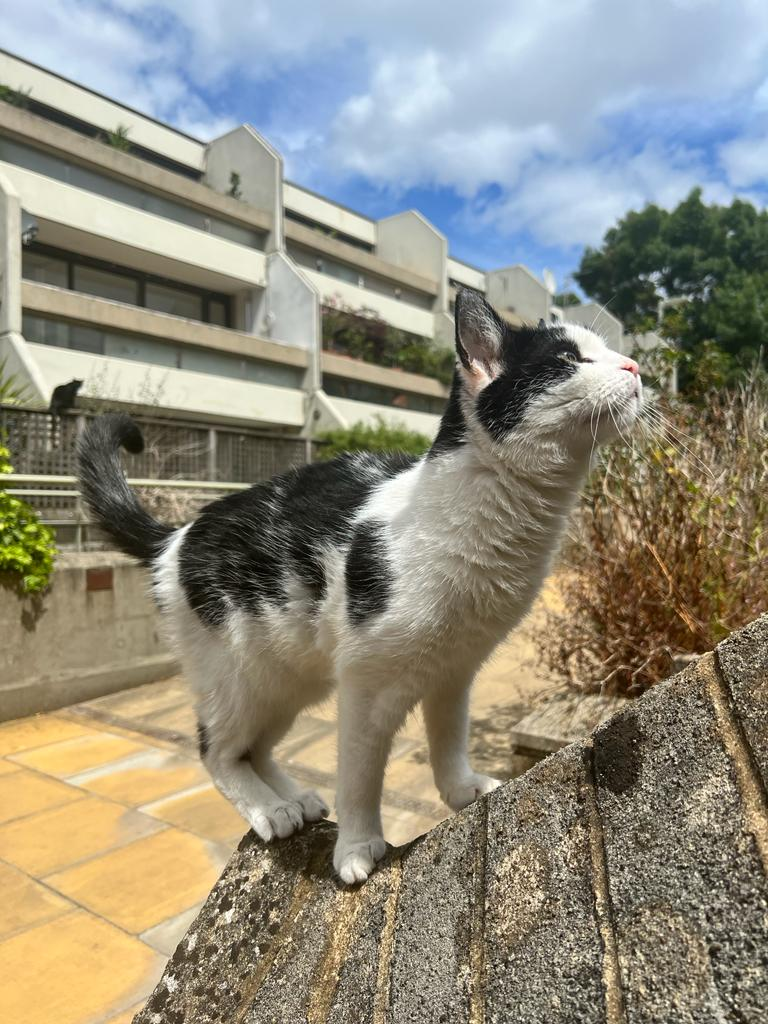
One of the estate's many cats.

The pedestrian streets provide a safe, walkable area where children are able to play, residents are able to socialise and the estate's many cats are frequently seen.
