= Magnolia (color) =

Color named after the flowering plant of the genus Magnolia

Color coordinates
- Hex triplet: #F2E8D7
- sRGB^{B} (r, g, b): (242, 232, 215)
- HSV (h, s, v): (38°, 11%, 95%)
- CIELCh_{uv} (L, C, h): (92, 16, 64°)
- Source: British Standard 08B1
- ISCC–NBS descriptor: Yellowish white
- B: Normalized to [0–255] (byte)

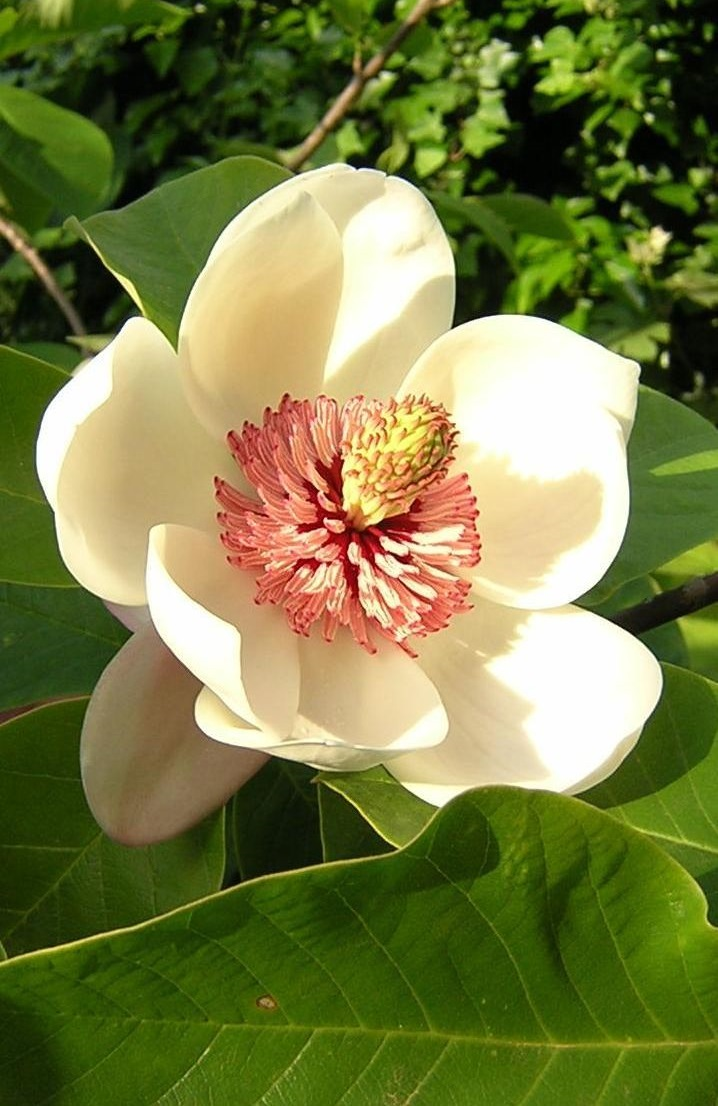
A Magnolia Flower.

Magnolia is a color named after the flowering plant of the genus Magnolia. As magnolias have flowers of more than one color, mainly cream or pale purple, magnolia may refer to different colors in different countries.

An early use of magnolia as a colour name in English was in 1880, describing it as a "tint of cream-color". In the UK, magnolia is a creamy colour defined by British Standard BS 08B15, with the sRGB value (244, 233, 216) and CMYK (Coated) value (0, 5, 25, 0). Although the interiors of houses in the UK have commonly been painted in pale "stone colours" since the 18th century, the use of the name "magnolia" only dates from the 1950s.

The Australian Standard AS 2700 definition of magnolia is noticeably more saturated than the British Standard one although its hue and luminosity are nearly the same: sRGB(240,223,196), HSV(79,16,90)

An alternative definition of the colour was published in America in 1925. Maerz and Paul's A Dictionary of Colour depicts three shades which are described as magnolia: However magnolia does not appear to be in common use as a colour name in the USA: the UK English Cambridge Dictionary entry for magnolia defines it both as "a type of tree with large, usually white or pink flowers" and "a pale cream colour", but its US English entry refers only to the tree.

== Magnolia in human culture ==
Real estate

- In the UK, magnolia paint is a neutral to warm cream, noted as being the 'standard' colour of household paint, other than white. It is a ubiquitous colour which is available in most types of paint.
- In Sleeping Murder Agatha Christie has her main character, who is a newcomer to England, the New Zealander Gwenda Reed, lament the use of this colour as she views houses for sale: "It was in quite good condition, but why were people like Mrs. Hengrave so fond of that mustard-cum-biscuit shade of wall paint?"
