= Hunters View =

Housing project in San Francisco, California, US

Coordinates: 37°44′08.8″N 122°22′50.4″W

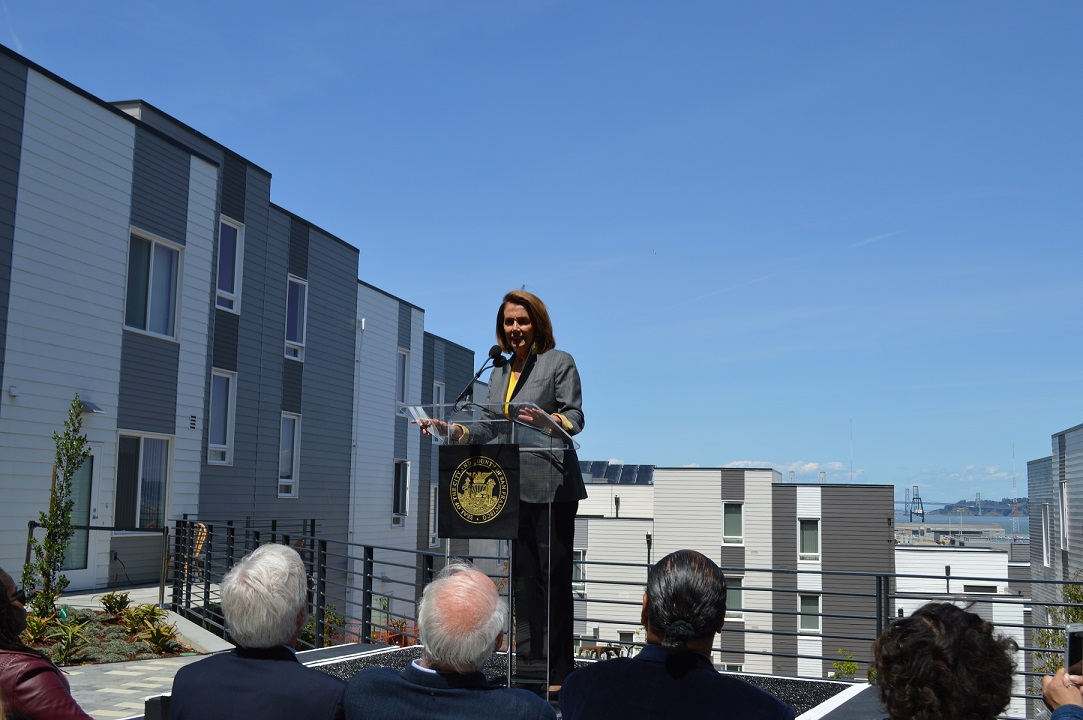
Representative Nancy Pelosi speaking about the ongoing redevelopment at Hunters View in 2017

Hunters View is a housing project in the Hunters Point neighborhood in San Francisco.

== History ==
The site, built in 1957 and intended to be temporary, was rated in 2007 by the U.S. Department of Housing and Urban Development with a score of 26 out of 100, ranking it as one of the worst housing developments in the United States, with problems such as boarded-up units, lack of smoke detectors, mold, broken appliances, holes in walls, bullet holes in walls, sewage flowing through the street because of a broken pipe, and burnt out garbage cans, and was the site of a housing fire in 1997 that killed 6 people. The City paid off a $12 million lawsuit to the fire victims' families in April 2009.

It has been the site of many crimes, which contributed to the homicide rate in San Francisco in the past, and in 2008 it received gunshot sensors due to the amount of crime in the area.

== Reconstruction ==
There are currently plans to overhaul the complex, which won't break ground until 2009, as the development is compared to some residents as a third-world country.

Starting in 2007, a multi-phase rebuilding of this complex has been ongoing. In 2016, the second of four phases was completed and provides 80 "public housing" units, and 27 "affordable" units (for households making 55 percent of median income or less) for a total cost of $84 million for the 107 units. (An average cost of $785,000 per unit) The complete cost of all phases is projected to be $450 million for a total of 700 units (an average cost of $643,000 per unit).
