= Parker Morris Committee =

Committee which wrote an influential report on UK public housing

The Parker Morris Committee drew up an influential 1961 report on housing space standards in public housing in the United Kingdom titled Homes for Today and Tomorrow. The committee was led by Sir Parker Morris. Its report concluded that the quality of social housing needed to be improved to match the rise in living standards, and made a number of recommendations. The Committee took a functional approach to determining space standards in the home by considering what furniture was needed in rooms, the space needed to use the furniture and move around it, and the space needed for normal household activities.

Out of the report came the Parker Morris Standards. In 1963 these were set out in the Ministry of Housing's "Design Bulletin 6 – Space in the Home". The report provided typical dimensions for the typical items of furniture for which the dwelling designer should allow space, and provided anthropometric data about the space needed to use and move about furniture. The bulletin also laid out sample room plans for a terraced house.

In 1967 these space standards became mandatory for all housing built in new towns; this was extended to all council housing in 1969, although they had already been adopted by many local councils by then.

The mandatory nature of the standards was ended by the Local Government, Planning and Land Act 1980, when the incoming Conservative government sought to reduce the cost of housing and, generally, public spending.

== Standards ==
Among the standards are that:

- In one-, two- and three-bedroom dwellings, one flushing toilet is required, and it may be in the bathroom.
- A semi-detached or end-of-terrace house for 4 people should have a net floor area of 72 m^{2} (780 sq ft).
- A dwelling for three or more people should have enclosed storage space for the kitchen of 2.3 m^{3} (81 cu ft).
- Dwellings should be fitted with heating systems that maintain the kitchen and circulation space at 13 °C (55.4 °F), and the living and dining spaces at 18 °C (64.4 °F), when the external temperature is −1 °C (30.2 °F).

=== Original 1961 Space Standards ===
Homes for today and tomorrow(p. 35) – Parker Morris 1961
Least net floor area in m^{2}	1 person	2 person	3 person	4 person	5 person	6 person
3 Storey House					93.8	97.5
int & ext storage					4.6	4.6
2 Storey House (Centre terraced)				74.3	84.5	92
int & ext storage				4.6	4.6	4.6
2 Storey House (Semi or End)				71.5	81.6	92
int & ext storage				4.6	4.6	4.6
Maisonettes				71.5	81.6	91.6
int & ext storage				3.2	3.2	3.2
Flat	29.7	44.6	56.7	69.7	79	n/a
int & ext storage	2.6	2.8	3	3.3	3.3	n/a
Single Storey House	32.5	48.3	60.9	71.5	79.9	88.2
int & ext storage	2.8	3.7	4.2	4.6	4.6	4.6

=== Modified 1967 Space Standards ===
Modified 1967 Parker Morris Space Standards
Dimensions in metric units including storage	1 person	2 person	3 person	4 person	5 person	6 person	7 person
1 Storey House	32.5	48.3	60.9	71.5	79.9	88.2	–
2 Storey House (Semi or End)				76.1	86.4	96.6	114
2 Storey House (Intermediate terraced)				78.9	89.1	96.6	114
3 Storey (excluding garage if built in)					98.4	102.1	118.4
Flats (minus 3.2 if balcony access)	32.3	47.4	59.7	73	82.3	89.7	–
Maisonettes				74.7	85	95.1	111.2

== 21st century ==
In the private sector the Parker Morris Standards influenced the 1967 and subsequent standards set by the National House Builders' Registration Council, now the National House Building Council, but were not adopted as written. However, it is widely felt that most public and private sector housing being built in the 21st century fails to meet the Parker Morris standards for floor and storage space, and this led to a decision in 2008 by the former government agency English Partnerships to re-introduce minimum standards that are 10% more generous than those of Parker Morris for developments on its own land.

Subsequently, The Office of the Mayor of London has also opted to move to adopt a Design Guide for Housing within the city, which will be 10% more generous than the Parker Morris Standards. This guide was published on 19 August 2010 and will be implemented from April 2011.

=== Mayor of London's Standards ===
4.1.1 Dwelling Space Standard
	Dwelling Type (bedroom/persons)	Essential GIA (m^{2})
Single storey dwelling	1b2p	50
	2b3p	61
	2b4p	70
	3b4p	74
	3b5p	86
	3b6p	95
	4b5p	90
	4b6p	99
Two storey dwelling	2b4p	83
	2b4p	87
	3b5p	96
	4b5p	100
	4b6p	107
Three storey dwelling	3b5p	102
	4b5p	106
	4b6p	113

For dwellings designed for more than 6 persons, at least 10 m^{2} (110 sq ft) gross internal area should be added per person.
