= Neave Brown =

British architect

- Born: May 22, 1929; Utica, New York
- Died: January 9, 2018 (aged 88); London, England
- Resting place: Highgate Cemetery
- Education: Architectural Association
- Occupation: Architect
- Awards: RIBA Royal Gold Medal
- Buildings: Winscombe Street 1965; Dunboyne Road Estate 1975; Alexandra Road Estate 1978; Medina Housing Estate 2003
- Website: www.neavebrown.com

Neave Brown (22 May 1929 – 9 January 2018) was an American-born British architect and artist. He specialized in modernist housing. Brown is the only architect to have had all his UK work listed: a row of houses in Winscombe Street, the Dunboyne Road Estate and Alexandra Road Estate, all located in Camden.

In October 2017, he won the Royal Gold Medal of the Royal Institute of British Architects for his Alexandra Road Estate, which is now considered a landmark of British social housing, and is Grade II* listed.

== Life ==
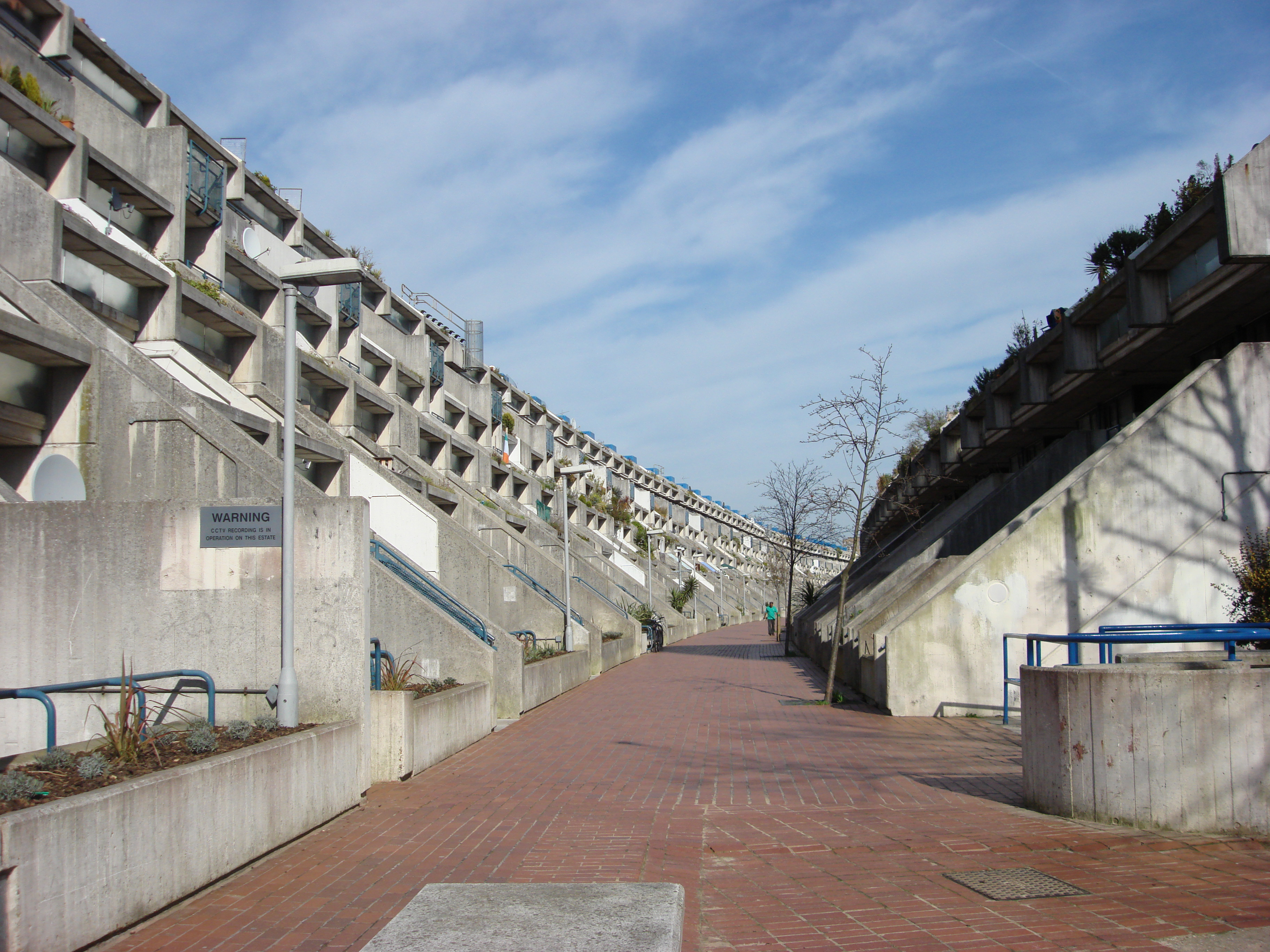
Alexandra Road estate

Brown was born on 22 May 1929 in Utica, New York. His mother was American and his father was British. He went to Bronxville High School, New York, USA from 1935 to 45 and attended Marlborough College 1945–1948 in the UK. During his military service in Great Britain he decided to study architecture and enrolled at the Architectural Association in London in 1950.

After graduating in 1956 and working in East Africa he gained valuable work experience in the firm Lyons Israel Ellis. Subsequently, he became an architect at the London Borough of Camden under Sydney Cook. Brown left the London Borough of Camden architecture department as continuous conflicts around the construction of the Alexandra Road Estate in Camden prevailed. After a public enquiry linked to overshooting costs and exceeding deadlines tried, unsuccessfully, to blame the architect, his reputation was nonetheless severely damaged in the UK, and for the rest of his architectural career he worked on often-lauded projects elsewhere in Europe.

Brown and his wife brought up their children in one of the five family houses at Winscombe Street, which Brown designed himself. After his children had left home, he and his wife moved to a 2-bed house at Dunboyne Road Estate, a council estate he had designed, where as of 2015 they had lived for about six years. Asked "If money were no object, where would you live?" he replied "Here!"

At the age of 73, Brown closed down his practice and studied fine art at the City and Guilds of London School of Art (BA), before spending the rest of his life working as an artist.

Brown was diagnosed with epithelioid mesothelioma in June, 2017. He died peacefully at home surrounded by family on 9 January 2018 at the age of 88. He is buried on the eastern side of Highgate Cemetery.

National Life Stories conducted an oral history interview (C467/113) with Neave Brown in 2013–14 for its Architects Lives' collection held by the British Library.

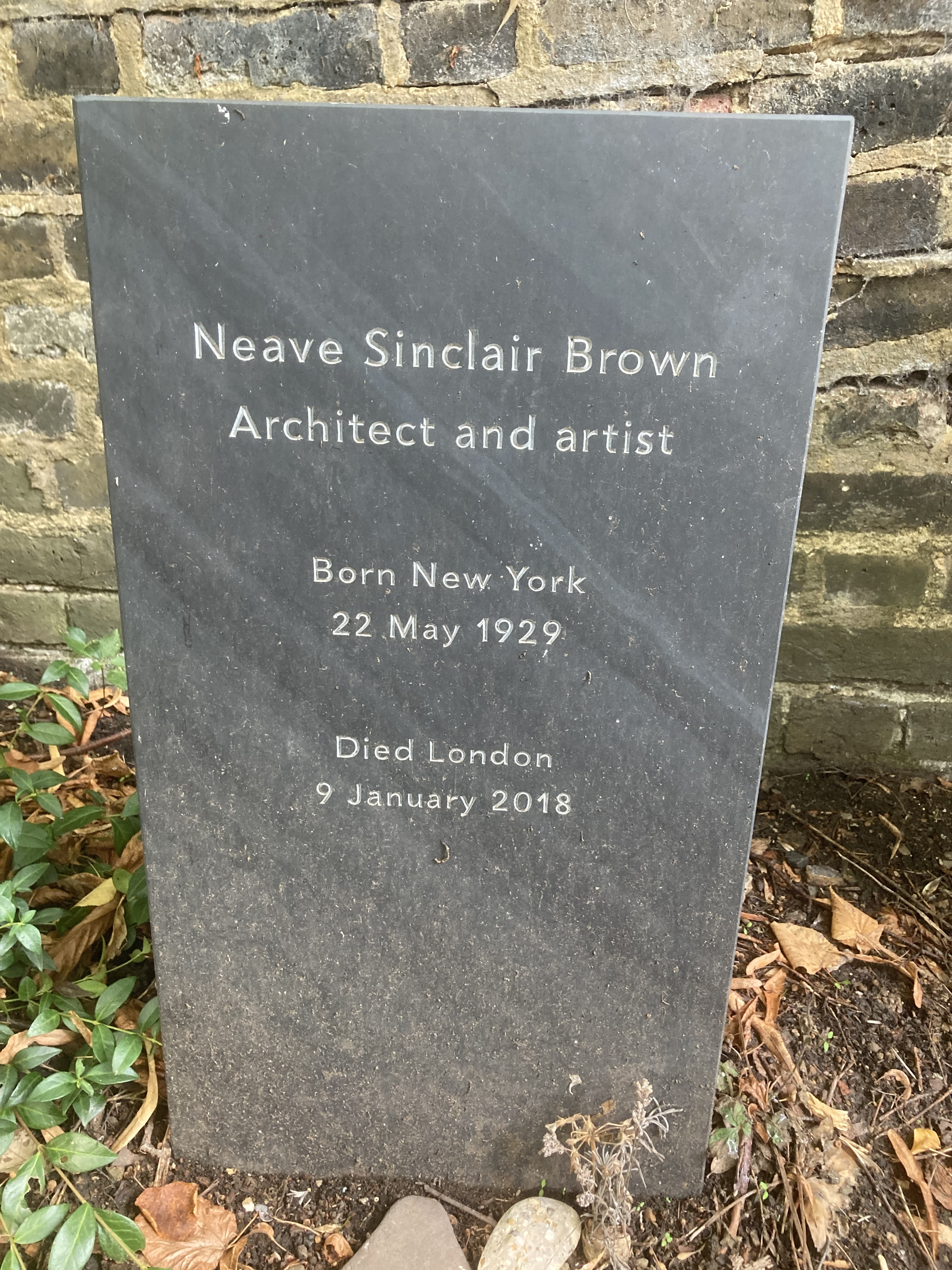
Grave of Neave Brown in Highgate Cemetery

== Work ==
He specialized in modernist housing and his works include:

- Five modern terraced houses in Winscombe Street, Highgate Newtown, London (1965)
- Dunboyne Road Estate (Fleet Road), Camden, London (1977)
- Alexandra Road Estate, Camden, London (1978)
- The Zwolsestraat Development in Scheveningen, The Hague, with David Porter (1994): 500 apartments, hotel, school hostel, landscaping including the largest underground car park (2,500 cars) in the Netherlands.
- Smalle Haven, Eindhoven, Netherlands (2002): Central urban development of terraced apartments including live/work units, shopping and office space.

In the essay "The form of housing" which was published in Architectural Design vol. 37 no.9 in 1967, Brown gives an account on the driving principles behind the "[changing] attitudes" towards housing at the time, emancipating himself from the Modern Movement: Instead of understanding the past as a mere ground for the figure of prominent modern towers the texture of the old is accepted as the context in which new is built, "exist[ing] side by side". He praises the nineteenth century streets as providing "immediacy of relationship between house and neighbourhood", and "the traditional quality of background stuff, anonymous, cellular, repetitive". Similarly the modern architect should provide concepts that "relate each house to its neighbour and to its open space, determine the desirable relationships between housing and the attendant functions" Furthermore, the modernist "isolation of the slab" has to be overcome again it is "the architect's job to structure the environment". Furthermore, Brown dismisses the idea of architecture as expendability and claims: "What we do now with both new and old is here to stay".

== Recognition ==
- Brown is the only architect to have had all his UK work listed
- Royal Gold Medal of the Royal Institute of British Architects in 2017
