= University of Leicester =

Public university in England

- Coat of arms of the University of Leicester Flag
- Motto: Latin: Ut Vitam Habeant
- Motto in English: So that they may have life
- Type: public research university
- Established: 1921 (as Leicestershire and Rutland University College); 1957 (gained university status by royal charter)
- Affiliations: ACU; AMBA; EUA; Midlands Innovation; Sutton 30; Universities UK
- Endowment: £24.3 million (2025)
- Budget: £395.0 million (2024/25)
- Chancellor: Dame Maggie Aderin-Pocock
- Vice-Chancellor: Nishan Canagarajah
- Visitor: Charles III
- Academic staff: 1,995 (2024/25)
- Administrative staff: 2,295 (2024/25)
- Students: 18,990 (2024/25); 17,370 FTE (2024/25)
- Undergraduates: 14,675 (2024/25)
- Postgraduates: 4,315 (2024/25)
- Location: Leicester, England, UK; 52°37′17″N 1°07′28″W
- Campus: Urban parkland
Colours
- Website: le.ac.uk

The University of Leicester (/ˈlɛstər/ LEST-ər) is a public research university based in Leicester, England. It was established as a university college in 1921. In 1957, the university's predecessor, University College, Leicester, gained university status by royal charter. The main campus is south of the city centre, adjacent to Victoria Park.

The university had an income of £395.0 million in 2024/25, of which £84.9 million was from research grants, with an expenditure of £407.3 million.

The university is known for the invention of genetic fingerprinting, and for partially funding the discovery and the DNA identification of the remains of King Richard III in Leicester.

== History ==
=== Desire for a university ===
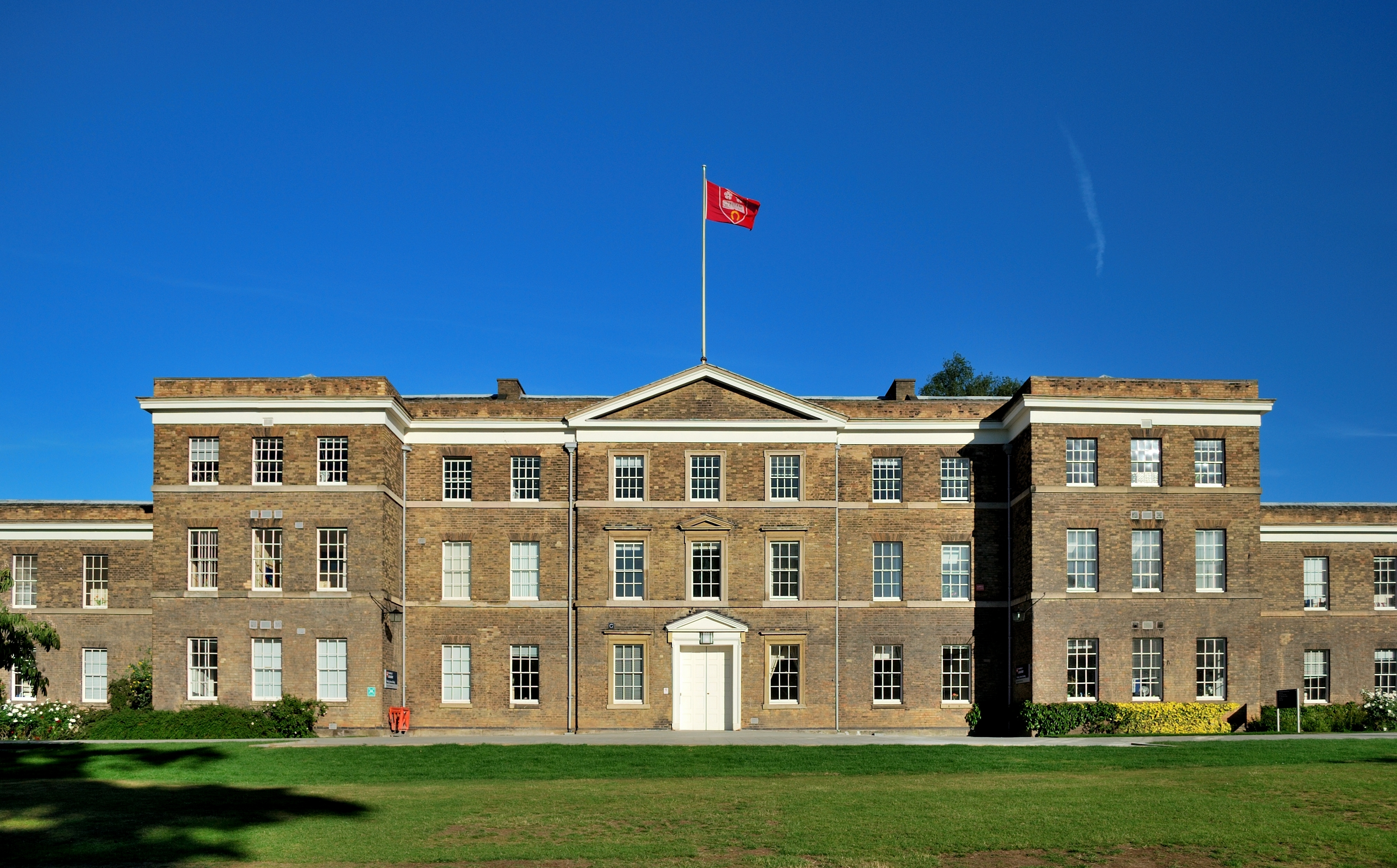
The Fielding Johnson Building (built 1837)

The first serious suggestions for a university in Leicester began with the Leicester Literary and Philosophical Society (founded at a time when "philosophical" broadly meant what "scientific" means today). With the success of Owens College in Manchester, and the establishment of the University of Birmingham in 1900, and then of Nottingham University College, it was thought that Leicester ought to have a university college too. From the mid-19th century to the mid-20th century university colleges could not award degrees and had to be associated with universities that had degree-giving powers. Most students at university colleges took examinations set by the University of London.

In the late 19th century the co-presidents of the Leicester Literary and Philosophical Society, the Revered James Went, headmaster of the Wyggeston Boys' School, and J. D. Paul, regularly called for the establishment of a university college. However, no private donations were forthcoming, and the Corporation of Leicester was busy funding the School of Art and the Technical School. The matter was brought up again by Dr Astley V. Clarke (1870–1945) in 1912. Born in Leicester in 1870, he had been educated at Wyggeston Grammar School and the University of Cambridge before receiving medical training at Guy's Hospital. He was the new president of the Literary and Philosophy society. Reaction was mixed, with some saying that Leicester's relatively small population would mean a lack of demand. With the outbreak of the First World War in 1914, talk of a university college subsided. In 1917 the Leicester Daily Post urged in an editorial that something of more practical utility than memorials ought to be created to commemorate the war dead. With the ending of the war both the Post and its rival the Leicester Mail encouraged donations to form the university college. Some suggested that Leicester should join forces with Nottingham, Sutton Bonington and Loughborough to create a federal university college of the East Midlands, but nothing came of this proposal.

=== Establishment ===
The old asylum building had often been suggested as a site for the new university, and after it was due to be finished being used as a hospital for the wounded, Astley Clarke was keen to urge the citizens and local authorities to buy it. Clarke quickly learned the building had already been bought by Thomas Fielding Johnson, a wealthy philanthropist who owned a worsted manufacturing business. He had bought 37 acres (15 ha) of land for £40,000 and intended not only to house the college, but also the boys' and girls' grammar schools. Further donations soon topped £100,000: many were given in memory of loved ones lost during the war, while others were for those who had taken part and survived. King George V gave his blessing to the scheme after a visit to the town in 1919.

Year	No of students
1944–45	84
1945–46	109
1946–47	218
1947–48	448
1948–49	568
1949–50	706
1950–51	730
1951–52	764

Talk turned to the curriculum with many arguing that it should focus on Leicester's chief industries hosiery, boots and shoes. Others had higher hopes than just technical training. The education acts of 1902 and 1918, which brought education to the masses was also thought to have increased the need for a college, not least to train the new teachers that were needed. Talk of a federal university soured and the decision was for Leicester to become a stand-alone college. In 1920, the college appointed its first official. W. G. Gibbs, a long-standing supporter of the college while editor of the Leicester Daily Post, was nominated as secretary. On 9 May 1921, Dr R. F. Rattray (1886–1967) was appointed principal, aged 35. Rattray was an impressive academic. Having gained a first class English degree at Glasgow, he studied at Manchester College, Oxford. He then studied in Germany, and secured his PhD at Harvard. After that, he worked as a Unitarian minister. Rattray was to teach Latin and English. He recruited others including Miss Measham to teach botany, Miss Sarson to teach geography, and Miss Chapuzet to teach French. In all, 14 people started at the university when it opened its doors in October 1921: the principal, the secretary, three lecturers and nine students (eight women and one man). Two types of students were expected, around 100–150 teachers in training, and undergraduates hoping to sit the external degrees of London University. A students union was formed in 1923–24 with a Miss Bonsor as its first president.

In 1927, after it became University College, Leicester, students sat for the examinations for external degrees of the University of London. Two years later, it merged with the Vaughan Working Men's College, which had been providing adult education in Leicester since 1862. In 1931, Dr Rattray resigned as principal. He was replaced in 1932 by Frederick Attenborough, who was the father of David and Richard Attenborough. He was succeeded by Charles Wilson in 1952.

=== University status to modern day ===
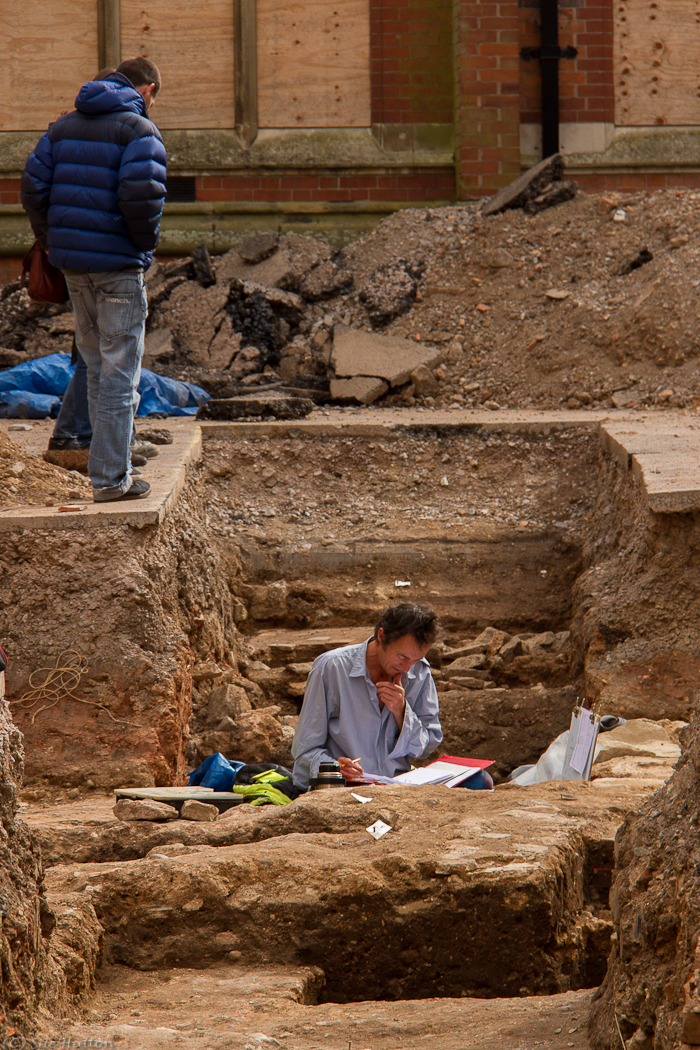
Archaeologists working on the site of Richard III's grave, in the former Greyfriars Church, in September 2012

In 1957, the University College was granted its royal charter, and has since then had the status of a university with the right to award its own degrees. The Percy Gee Student Union building was opened by Queen Elizabeth II on 9 May 1958.

Leicester University won the first ever series of University Challenge, in 1963. The university's motto Ut Vitam Habeant – "so that they may have life", is a reflection of the war memorial origins of its formation. It is believed to have been Rattray's suggestion.

The university medical school, Leicester Medical School, opened in 1971.

In 1994, the University of Leicester celebrated winning the Queen's Anniversary Prize for its work in Physics & Astronomy. The prize citation reads: "World-class teaching, research and consultancy programme in astronomy and space and planetary science fields. Practical results from advanced thinking".

In 2011, the university was selected as one of four sites for national high performance computing (HPC) facilities for theoretical astrophysics and particle physics. An investment of £12.32 million, from the Government's Large Facilities Capital Fund, together with investment from the Science and Technology Facilities Council and from universities contribute to a national supercomputer.

In September 2012, a ULAS team exhumed the body of King Richard III, discovering it in the former Greyfriars Friary Church in the city of Leicester. As a result of that success Prof King was asked to investigate whether a skeleton found in Jamestown was that of George Yeardley, the 1st colonial governor of Virginia and founder of the Virginia General Assembly.

In January 2017, Physics students from the University of Leicester made national news when they revealed their predictions on how long it would take a zombie apocalypse to wipe out humanity. They calculated that it would take just 100 days for zombies to completely take over earth. At the end of the 100 days, the students predicted that just 300 humans would remain alive and without infection.

In January 2021, around 200 UCU members at the university passed a no-confidence motion in Vice Chancellor Nishan Canagarajah because of proposed cuts putting 145 staff members at risk of redundancy. There was anger at his claim that redundancies are needed to "continue to deliver excellence". In April, the UCU urged academics to boycott the university due to the planned redundancies, including encouraging people to not apply for jobs at Leicester or collaborate on new research projects.

== Campus ==
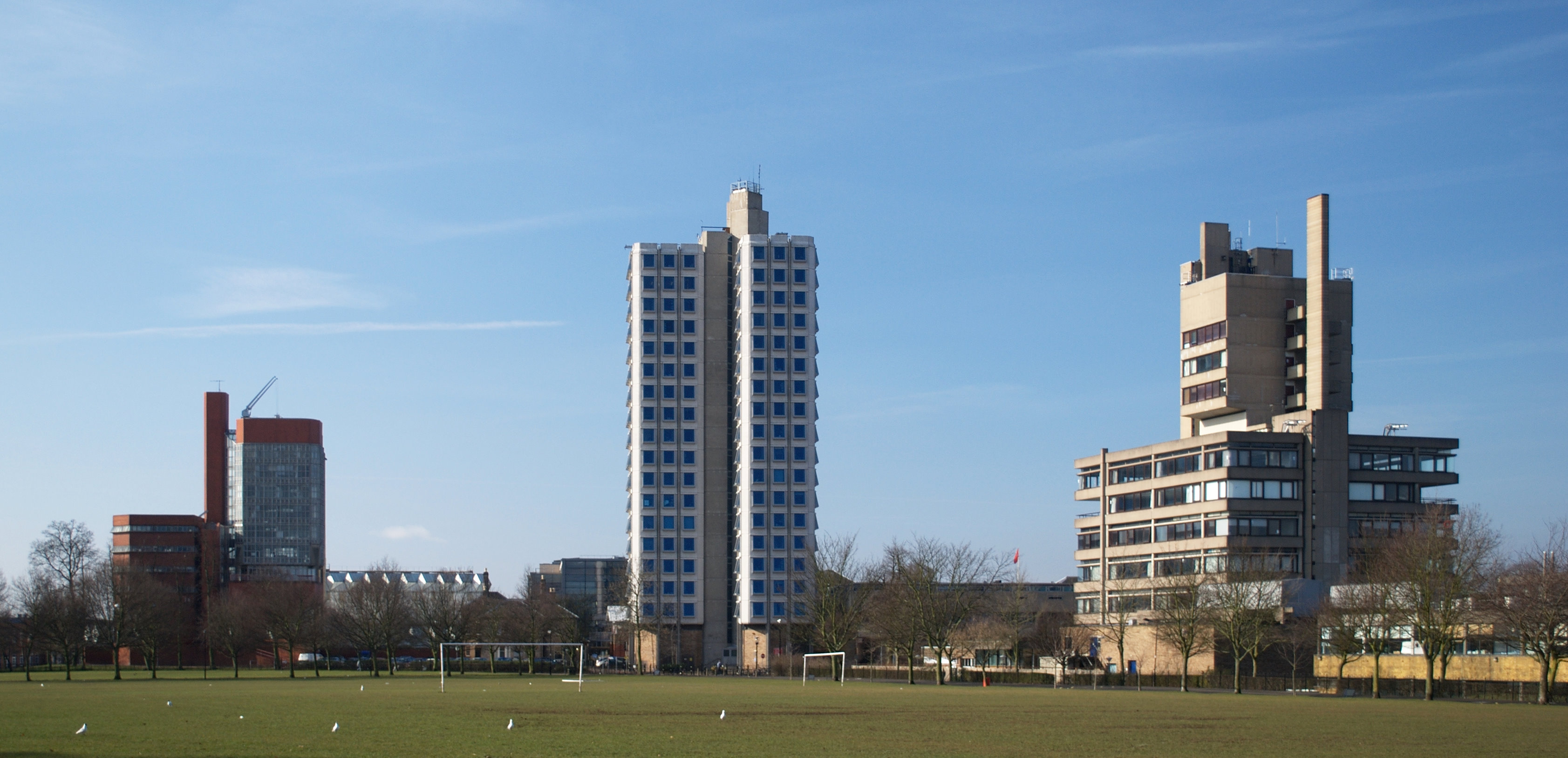
University of Leicester seen from Victoria Park – left to right: the Engineering Building, the Attenborough Tower, the Charles Wilson Building

The main campus is a mile south of the city centre, adjacent to Victoria Park and Wyggeston and Queen Elizabeth I College. The skyline of the university is punctuated by three distinctive, towering, buildings from the 1960s: the Department of Engineering, the Attenborough Tower and the Charles Wilson Building.

=== Fielding Johnson Building ===
The Fielding Johnson Building was designed by William Parsons in a late Georgian provincial style as the Leicestershire and Rutland County Asylum. From 1921 the building was home to most of the university departments until purpose-built accommodation was created, and it was renamed the Fielding Johnson Building in 1964. It now houses the university's administration offices, Leicester Law School (including the original university library Harry Peach Law Library, the Legal Advice Clinic, moot court), and the university's council chambers. The south wing of this building includes the university's Accessibility service for disabled students and access to the Peter Williams lecture theatre and Ogden Lewis Seminar Suite in the lower storeys of the David Wilson main library building.

=== Attenborough Tower ===
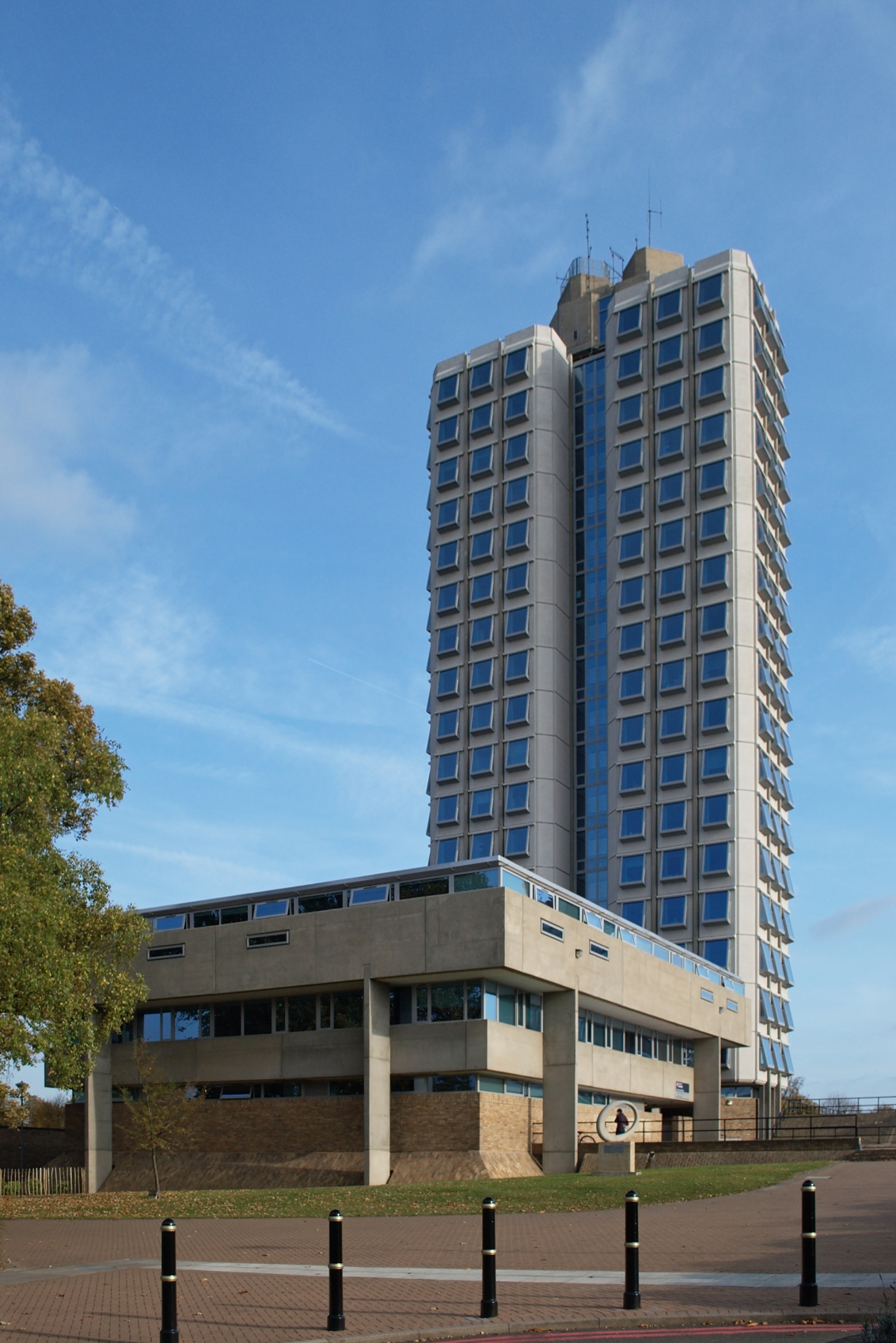
The Attenborough Tower, home of many of the university's arts departments

The 18-storey Attenborough Tower is home to the College of Social Sciences and has undergone extensive renovation.

=== Engineering Building ===
The Engineering Building was the first major building by British architects James Stirling and James Gowan. This Grade II* listed building comprises workshops and laboratories at ground level, and a tower containing offices and lecture theatres.

=== Other buildings ===
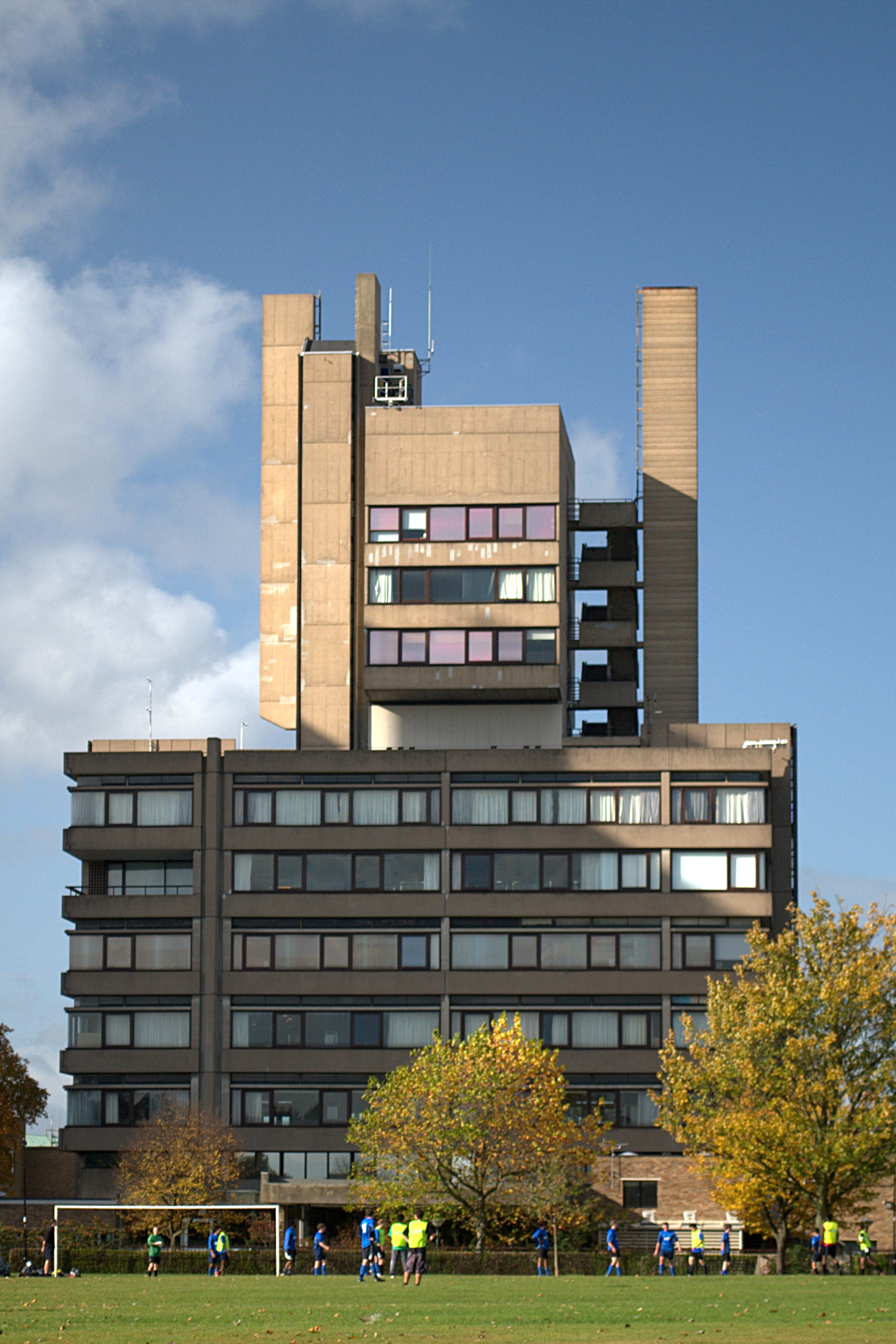
The brutalist Charles Wilson Building by Denys Lasdun

Opposite the Fielding Johnson Building are the Astley Clarke Building, home to the School of Criminology and Sociology, and the Danielle Brown Sports Centre.

The Ken Edwards Building, built in 1995, lies adjacent to the Fielding Johnson Building and is home to part of the School of Computing and Mathematical Science, the School of Modern Languages and learning spaces shared by a variety of the university's schools.

Built in 1957, the Percy Gee Building is home to Leicester University's Students' Union. Percy Gee was one of the first treasurers of the University College.

The David Wilson Library was opened by Queen Elizabeth II on 4 December 2008, following an extensive refurbishment with a budget of £32 million.

The Bennett Building, Physics and Astronomy Building, the Chemistry Building and the Adrian Building lie beyond the Charles Wilson Building. Across University Road, linked by pedestrian bridges, lie the Maurice Shock and Hodgkin Buildings. Further along University Road is the George Davies Centre building (built 2016), home to Leicester's Medical School.

The Adrian Building was built in 1967 and designed by Courtald Technical Services which became W.F Johnson & Partners. It was named after Edgar Adrian the first chancellor of the university (1957–1971). The Charles Wilson Building was designed by Denys Lasdun and completed in 1967. Its distinctive brutalist silhouette created by the additional upper storeys and related structures have led to it being likened to the Transformer Optimus Prime by local residents and alumni.

Along London road is the Brookfield campus home to the College of Business (previously known as the University of Leicester School of Business or ULSB) and the post-graduate centre. It was sympathetically renovated, with the original building being built in 1870 and was home to Thomas Fielding Johnson, the founder of the University of Leicester.

Further along University Road and on Salisbury Road and Regents Road is the School of Education.

On Lancaster Road there is the Attenborough Arts Centre, the university's arts centre.

Leicester's halls of residence are noteworthy: many of the halls (nearly all located in Oadby) date from the early 1900s and were the homes of Leicester's wealthy industrialists. Accommodation on campus is at Freemen's Common and Nixon Court.

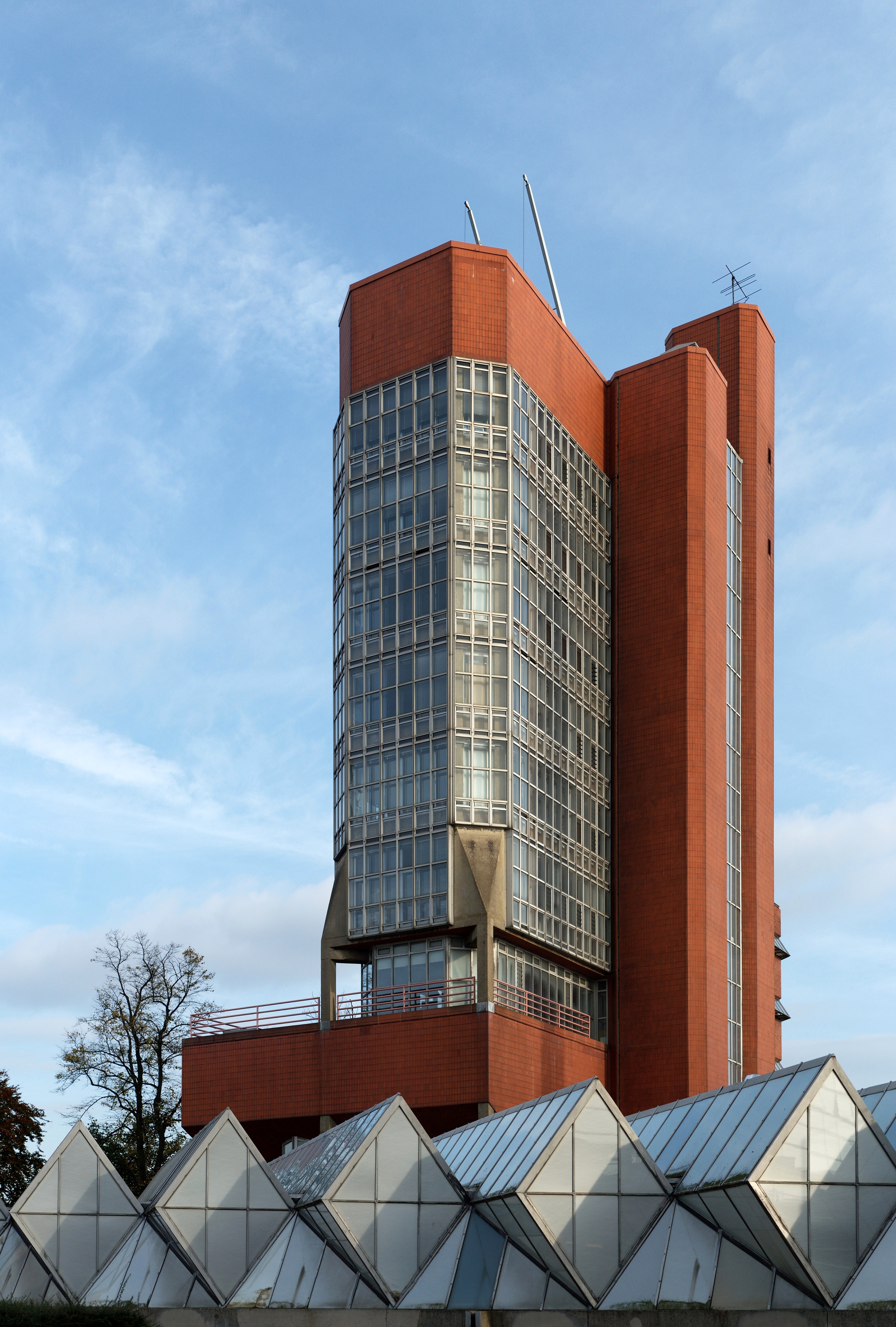
The Engineering Building, designed by James Stirling, James Gowan and Frank Newby

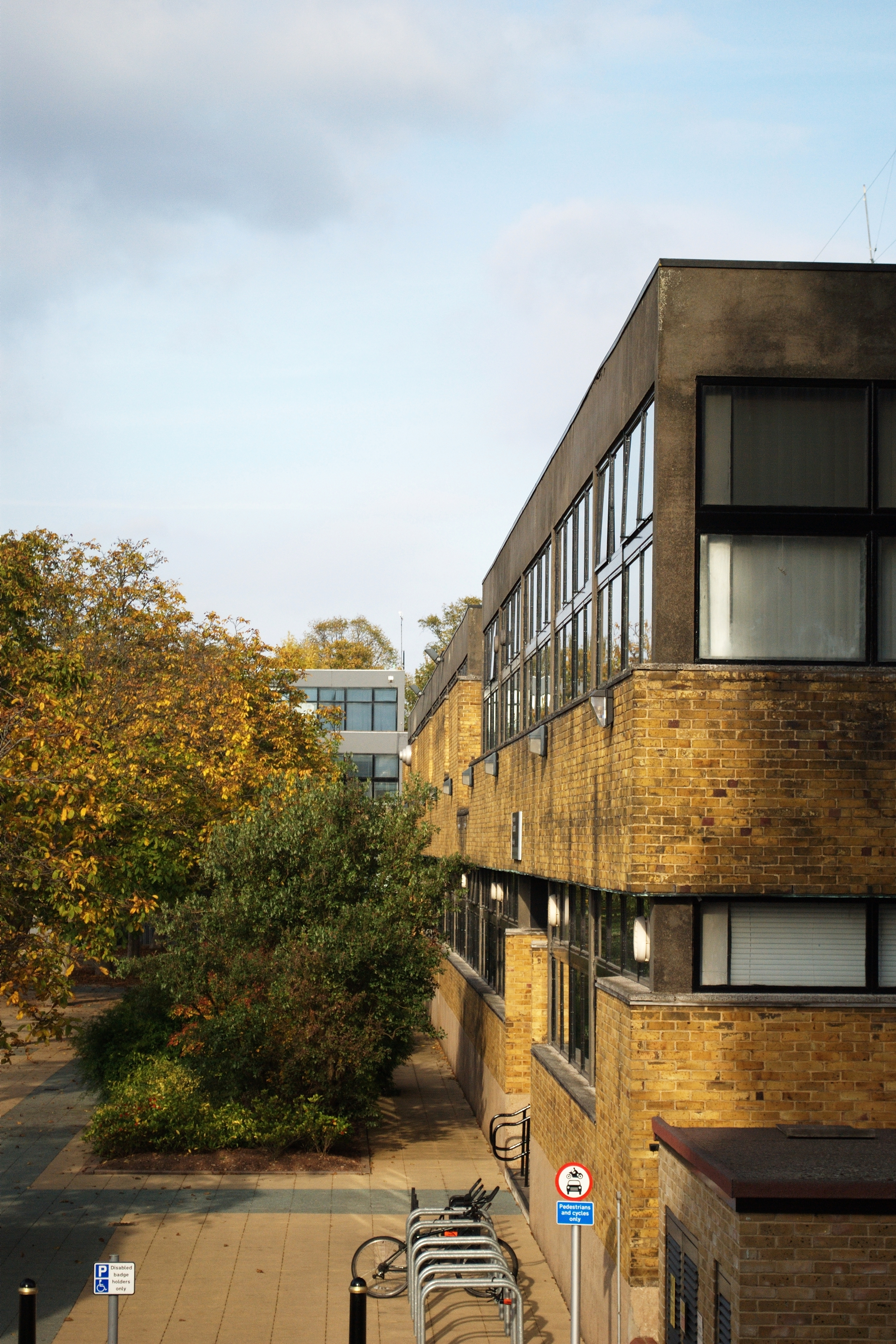
The Physics and Astronomy Building, part of a larger complex by Leslie Martin

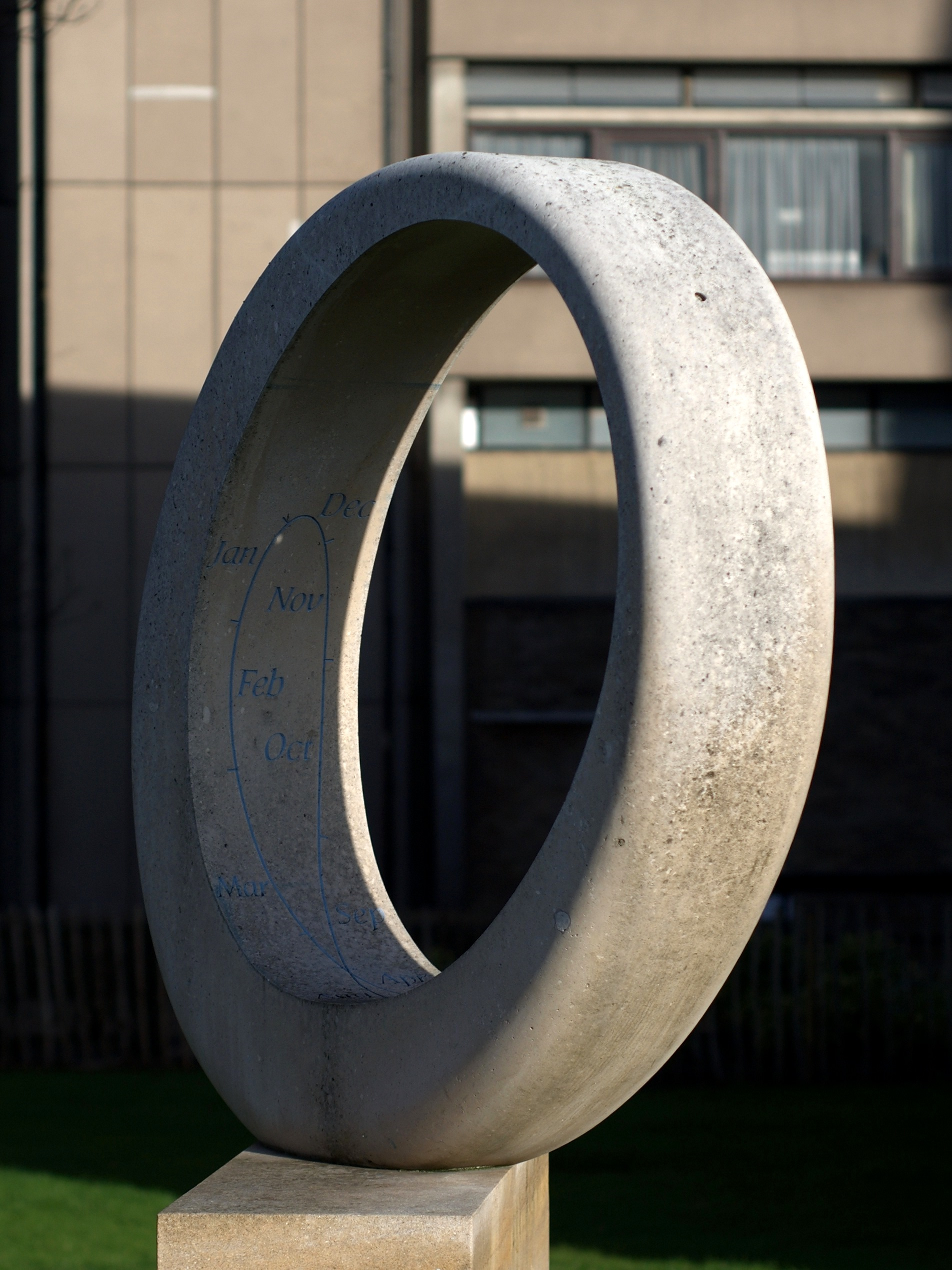
Eye of Time sundial

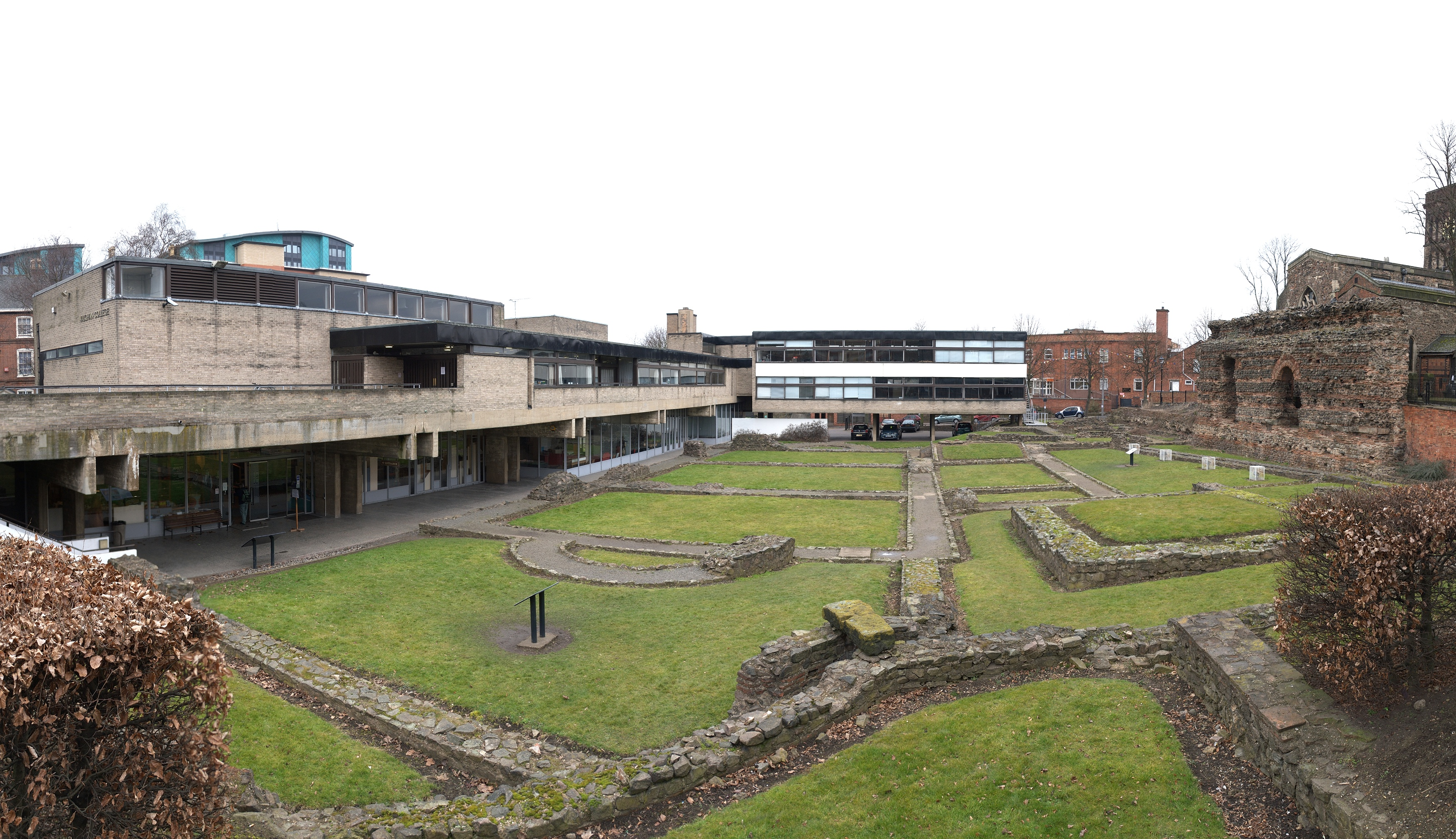
Vaughan College, the university's former adult education college, is Grade II listed and faces the Jewry Wall Roman ruins

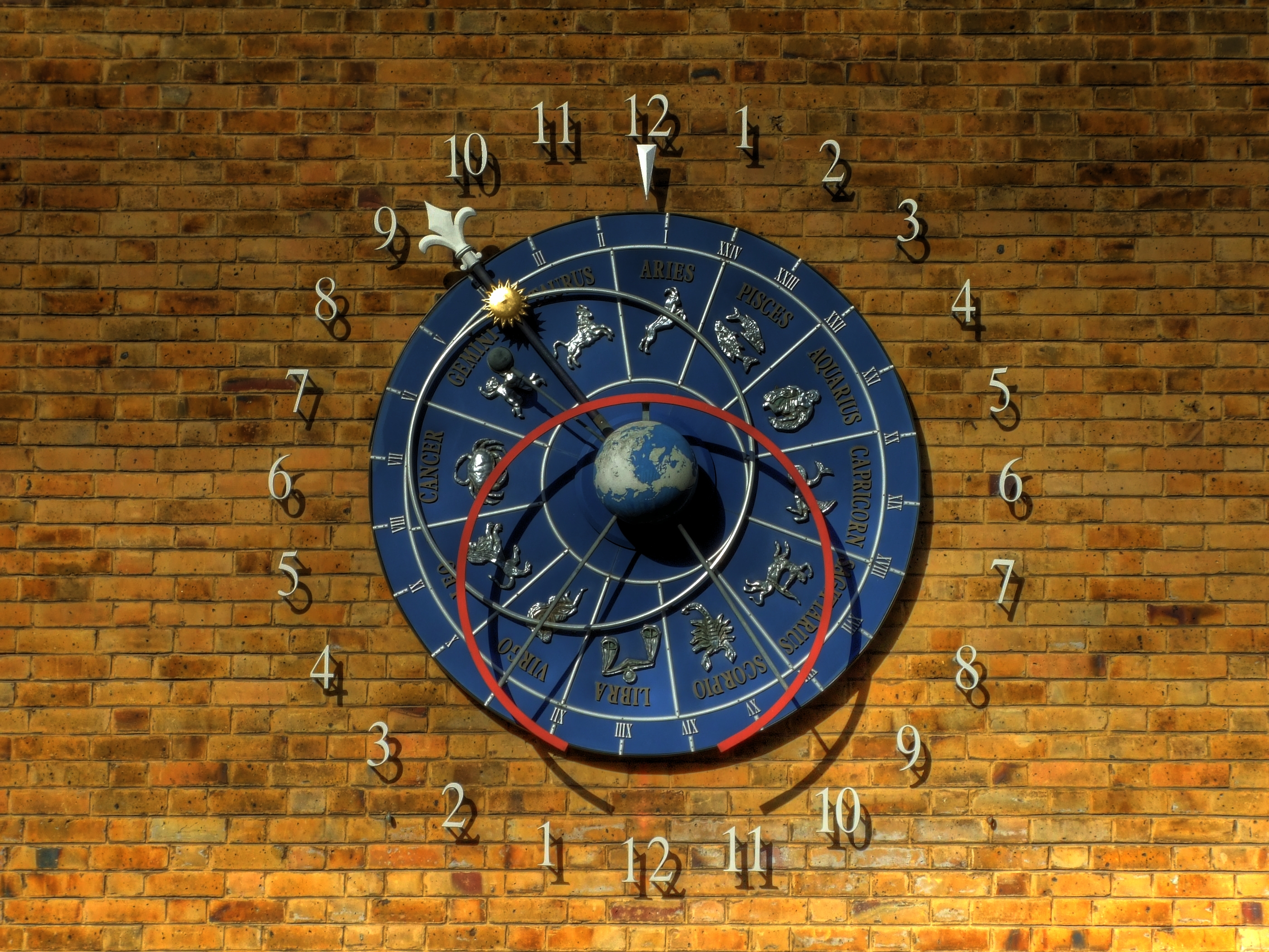
Leicester University astronomical clock

=== Development ===
In recent years, the university has disposed of some of its poorer quality property in order to invest in new facilities, and is currently undergoing a £300+ million redevelopment. The new John Foster Hall of Residence opened in October 2006. The David Wilson Library, twice the size of the previous University Library, opened on 1 April 2008 and a new biomedical research building (the Henry Wellcome Building) has already been constructed. A complete revamp of the Percy Gee Student Union building was completed in September 2010. Nixon Court was extended and refurbished in 2011. In the early 2020s the Freemen's Common accommodation was demolished, replaced with new accommodation named known collectively as both Freemen's Common and Freemen's, a multi-storey car park and the Sir Bob Burgess Building, a building with learning facilities and offices that is shared across multiple departments of the university.

== Organisation ==
The university's academic schools and departments are organised into colleges. In August 2015, the colleges were further restructured with the merging of Social Sciences and Arts, Humanities and Law to give the following structure:

=== College of Life Sciences ===
The college has the following academic schools:

- Leicester Medical School
- School of Biological Sciences
- School of Psychology
- School of Allied Health Professions

The research departments and institutes:

- Cardiovascular Sciences
- Genetics and Genome Biology (including the Leicester Cancer Research Centre)
- Health Sciences (including the Leicester Diabetes Centre)
- Infection, Immunity and Inflammation
- Molecular and Cell Biology
- Neuroscience, Psychology and Behaviour (including the Centre for Systems Neuroscience)
- Leicester Precision Medicine Institute (including Leicester Drug Discovery and Diagnostics)
- Leicester Institute of Structural and Chemical Biology

==== Leicester Medical School ====
The university is home to a large medical school, Leicester Medical School, which opened in 1971. The school was formerly in partnership with the University of Warwick, and the Leicester-Warwick medical school proved to be a success in helping Leicester expand, and Warwick establish. The partnership ran the end of its course towards the end of 2006 and the medical schools became autonomous institutions within their respective universities.

=== College of Science and Engineering ===
The college comprises the following departments:

- Chemistry
- Informatics
- School of Geography Geology & the Environment
- Engineering
- Computing and Mathematical Sciences
- Physics and Astronomy

There are also interdisciplinary research centres for Space Research, Climate Change Research, Mathematical/Computational Modelling and Advanced Microscopy.

==== Engineering ====
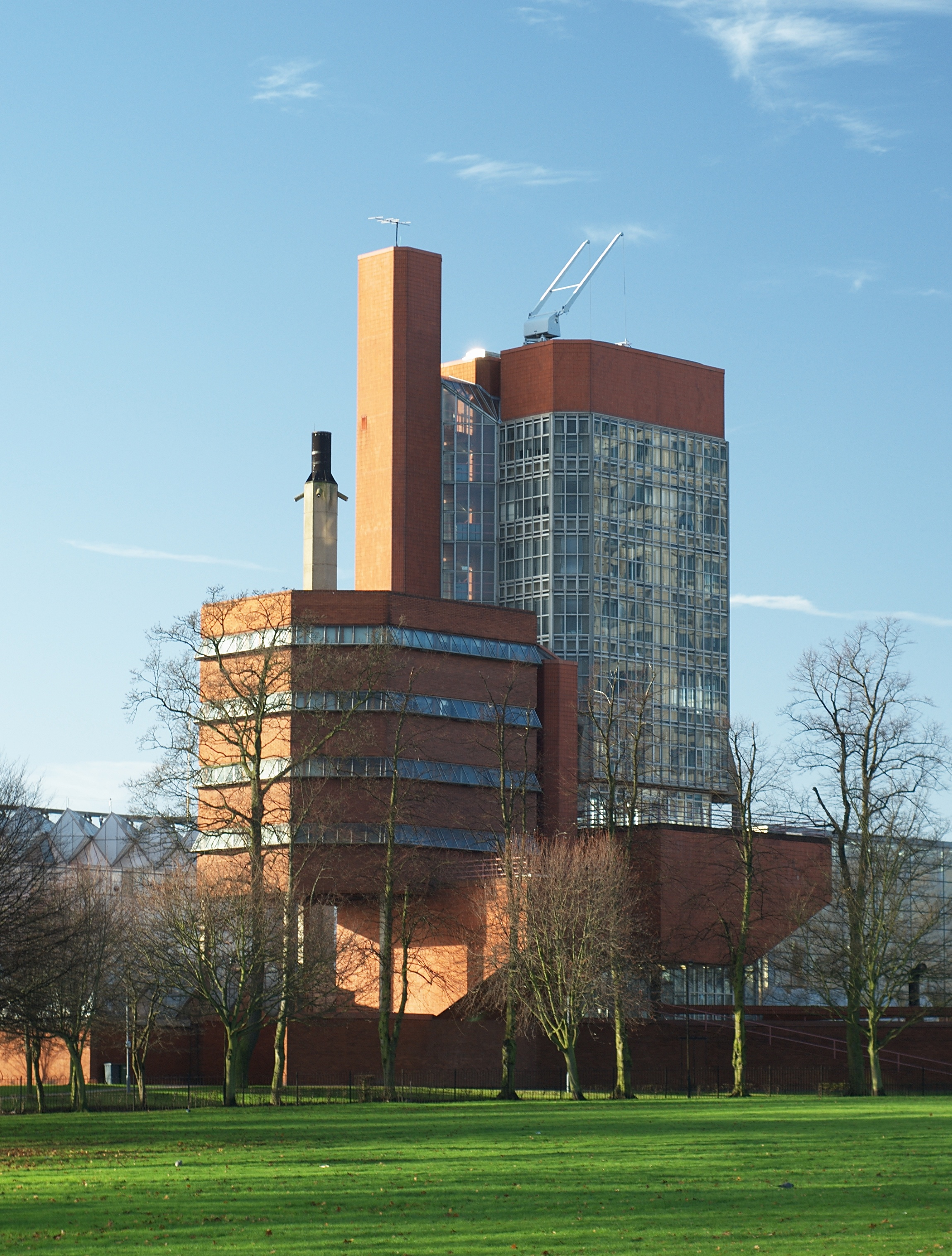
The Grade II* listed Engineering Building

The department offers MEng and BEng degrees in Aerospace Engineering, Embedded Systems Engineering, Communications and Electronic Engineering, Electrical and Electronic Engineering, Mechanical Engineering and General Engineering. Each course is accredited by the relevant professional institutions. The department also offers MSc courses.

==== Physics and Astronomy ====
The department has around 350 undergraduate students, following either BSc (three-year) or MPhys (four-year) degree courses, and over 70 postgraduate students registered for a higher degree.

The main Physics building is the primary base for two research groups – Planetary Science and Astrophysics – as well as centres for supercomputing, microscopy, Gamma and X-ray astronomy, and the Swift UK Data Centre. Space Park Leicester, officially opened in 2022, is the main home of the Earth Observation Science and Space Projects and Instrumentation groups. The department also runs the University of Leicester Observatory in Manor Road, Oadby. With a 20-inch telescope it is one of the UK's largest and most advanced astronomical teaching facilities. The department has close involvement with the National Space Centre also located in Leicester.

The department is home to the university's ALICE 3400+ core supercomputer and is a member of the UK's DiRAC (DiStributed Research utilising Advanced Computing) consortium. DiRAC is the integrated supercomputing facility for theoretical modelling and HPC-based research in particle physics, astronomy and cosmology.

=== College of Social Sciences, Arts and Humanities ===
The college has 10 schools including:

- American Studies
- Archaeology and Ancient History
- School of Arts
- School of Business
- Criminology
- Education
- History, Politics and International Relations
- Leicester Law School
- School of Media, Communication and Sociology
- Museum Studies

==== Archaeology and Ancient History ====
The School of Archaeology and Ancient History was formed in 1990 from the then Departments of Archaeology and Classics, under the headship of Graeme Barker. The academic staff currently (as of January 2017) include 21 archaeologists and 8 ancient historians, though several staff teach and research in both disciplines.

The School has particular strengths in Mediterranean archaeology, ancient Greek and Roman history, and the archaeology of recent periods; and is also home to the University of Leicester Archaeological Services (ULAS).

==== Business ====
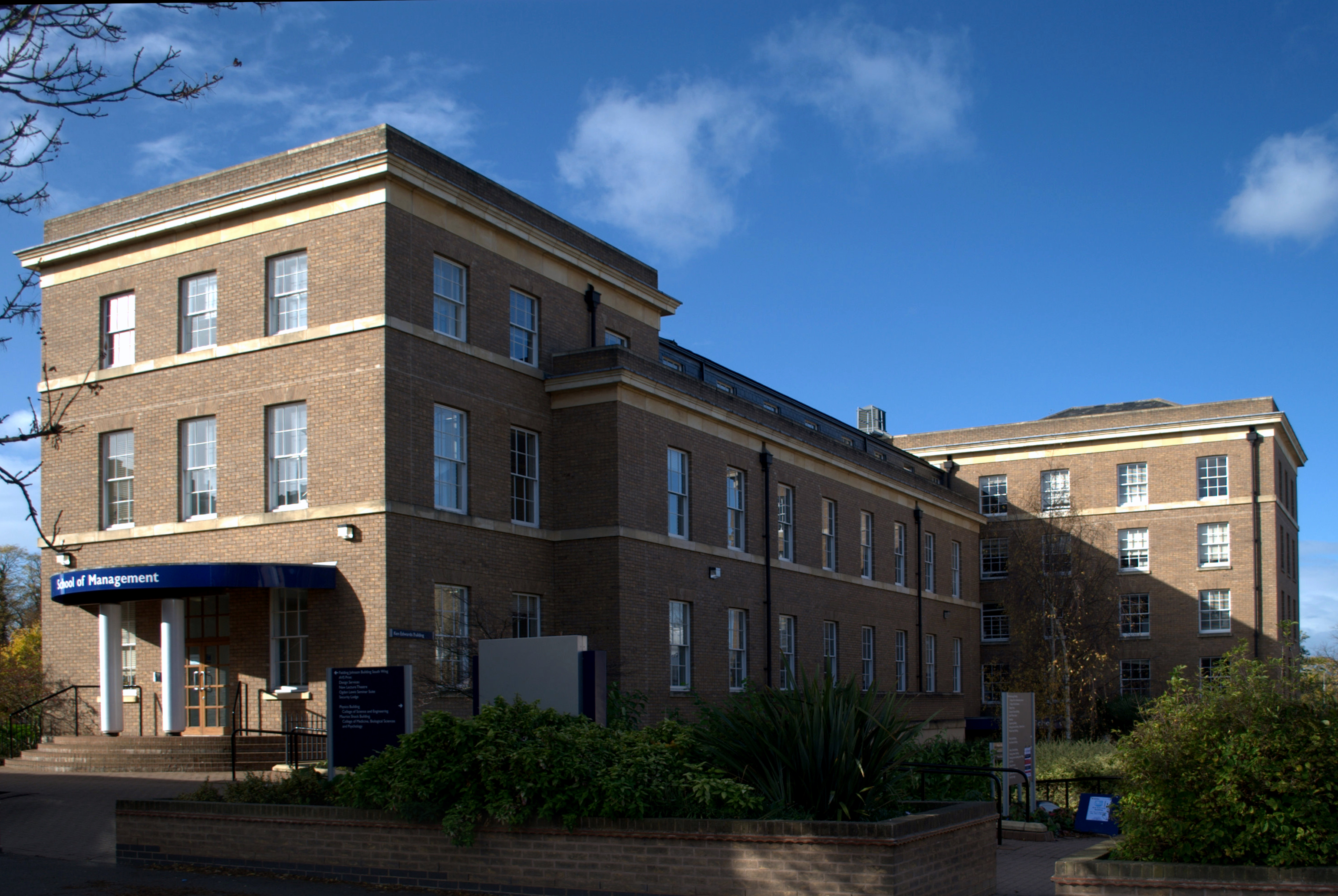
The Ken Edwards Building, former home of the School of Management, now part of the School of Business

The School of Business was founded in 2016, bringing together the expertise of the School of Management and the Department of Economics. The new school now has approximately 150 academic staff, 50 from Economics and 100 from Management. In 2010 the former School of Management was ranked 2nd after Oxford University by the Guardian.

The School of Business provides postgraduate and undergraduate programmes in Management, Accounting and Economics. The School of Business, is one of the approximately 270 Schools/Universities in the world accredited by AMBA.

==== English ====
The School of English teaches English at degree level. The school offers English studies from contemporary writing to Old English and language studies. It contains the Victorian Studies Centre, the first of its kind in the UK. Malcolm Bradbury is one of the department's most famous alumni: he graduated with a First in English in 1953.

==== Historical Studies ====
The School of Historical Studies is one of the largest of any university in the country. It has made considerable scholarly achievements in many areas of history, notably urban history, English local history, American studies and Holocaust studies. The school houses both the East Midlands Oral History Archive (EMOHA) and the Media Archive for Central England.

==== Law ====
The School of Law is one of the biggest departments in the university. According to the Times Online Good University Guide 2009, the Faculty of Law was ranked 8th, out of 87 institutions, making it one of the top law schools in the country.

== Academic profile ==
=== Admissions ===
UCAS Admission Statistics
	2025	2024	2023	2022	2021
Applications (Note: Main scheme applications, International and UK)	29,660	26,690	27,195	24,940	20,995
Accepted	6,085	5,005	4,960	4,555	3,690
Applications/Accepted Ratio	4.9	5.3	5.5	5.5	5.7
Overall Offer Rate (%)	72.9	73.6	69.2	68.2	70.5
↳ UK only (%) (Note: UK domiciled applicants)	73.4	74.4	69.6	67.9	69.0
Average Entry Tariff	—N/a	—N/a	120	132	132
↳ Top three exams (Note: The maximum tariff score for three exams is 168: the equivalent of A*A*A* at A-Level, 777 at HL for the IB Diploma Programme, or AAA at Advanced Higher)	—N/a	—N/a	121.4	127.5	126.7

HESA Student Body Composition (2024/25)
Domicile and Ethnicity	Total
British White (Note: Not be confused solely with White British)	30%
British Ethnic Minorities (Note: Includes those who indicate that they identify as Asian, Black, Mixed Heritage, Arab or any other ethnicity except White.)	51%
International EU	1%
International Non-EU	18%
Undergraduate Widening Participation Indicators
Female	53%
Independent School	7%
Low Participation Areas (Note: Calculated from the Polar4 measure, using Quintile1, in England and Wales. Calculated from the Scottish Index of Multiple Deprivation (SIMD) measure, using SIMD20, in Scotland.)	11%

In the 2024/25 academic year, the student body consisted of 18,990 students, composed of 14,675 undergraduates and 4,315 postgraduate students. The university is designated as a 'medium-tariff' institution by the Department for Education, with the average undergraduate entrant to the university in recent years amassing between 121–128 UCAS Tariff points in their top three pre-university qualifications – the equivalent of BBB to ABB at A-Level. Based on 2022/23 HESA entry standards data published in domestic league tables, which include a broad range of qualifications beyond the top three exam grades, the average student at the University of Leicester achieved 132 points. According to the 2017 Times and Sunday Times Good University Guide, approximately 2% of Leicester's undergraduates come from independent schools.

=== Teaching ===
The university is held in high regard for the quality of its teaching. 19 subject areas have been graded as "Excellent" by the Quality Assurance Agency – including 14 successive scores of 22 points or above stretching back to 1998, six of which were maximum scores.

Leicester was ranked joint first in the 2005, 2006, and 2007 National Student Survey for overall student satisfaction among mainstream universities in England. It was second only to Cambridge in 2008 and again joint first in 2009.

=== Rankings and reputation ===
Rankings
National rankings
- Complete (2027): 33
- Guardian (2027): 39
- Times / Sunday Times (2027): 31

Global rankings
- ARWU (2026): 301–400
- QS (2027): 314=
- THE (2026): 192=

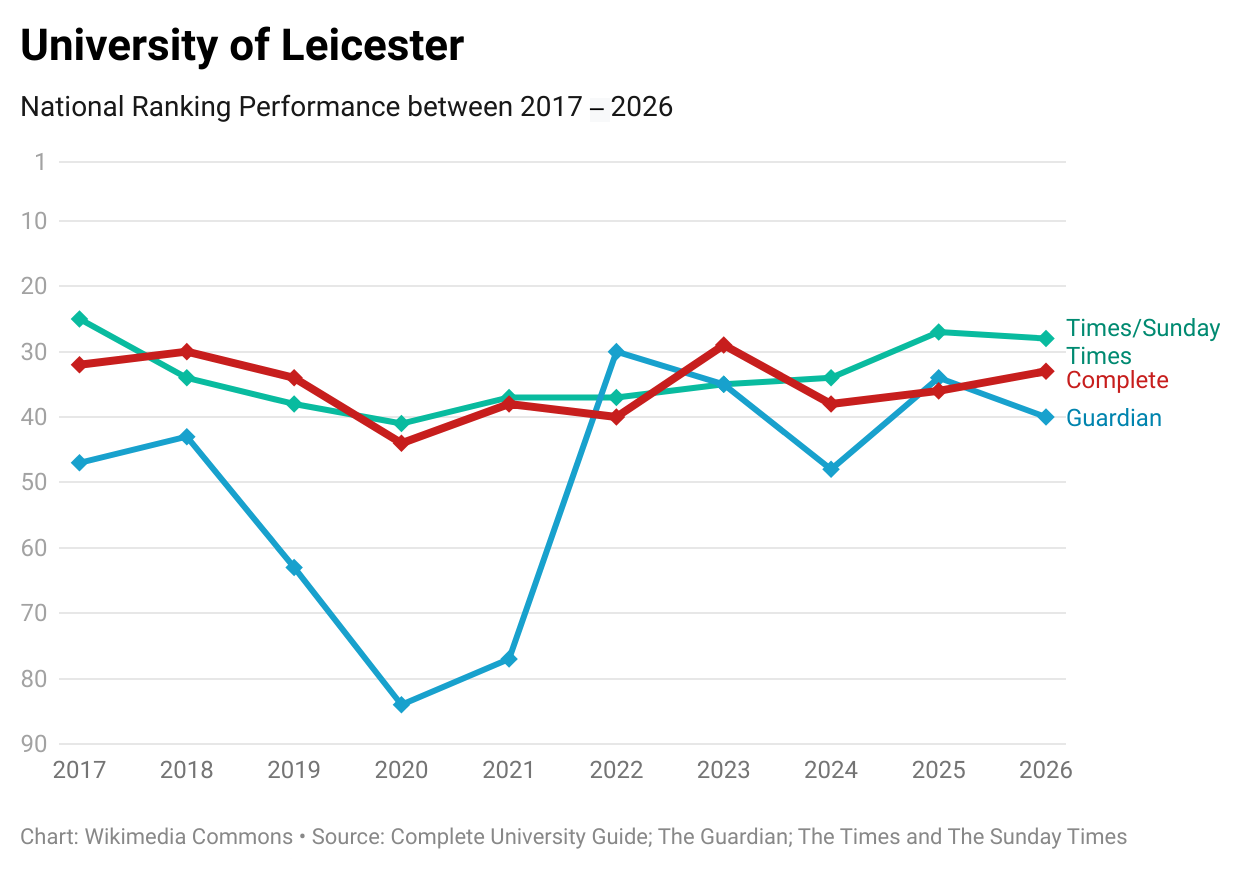
University of Leicester's national league table performance over the past ten years

The university was named University of the Year in 2008 by the Times Higher Education. The university has consistently been ranked among the top 30 universities in the United Kingdom by the Times Good University Guide and The Guardian. In September 2025, it was announced that the university had maintained its top 30 ranking within the UK, according to The Times and The Sunday Times Good University Guide 2026. In October 2025, the university was ranked within the top 30 in the world for research quality, according to the Times Higher Education World University Rankings for 2026.

=== Research ===
The university has research groups in the areas of astrophysics, biochemistry and genetics. The techniques used in genetic fingerprinting were invented and developed at Leicester in 1984 by Sir Alec Jeffreys. It also houses Europe's biggest academic centre for space research, in which space probes have been built, most notably the Mars Lander Beagle 2, which was built in collaboration with the Open University.

Leicester Physicists (led by Ken Pounds) were critical in demonstrating a fundamental prediction of Albert Einstein's General Theory of Relativity – that black holes exist and are common in the universe. It is a founding partner of the £52 million National Space Centre.

Leicester is one of a small number of universities to have won the prestigious Queen's Anniversary Prize for Higher Education on more than one occasion: in 1994 for physics & astronomy and again in 2002 for genetics.

The 2014 Research Excellence Framework (REF) exercise for the School of Archaeology and Ancient History, 74% of research activity, including 100% of its Research Environment, was classed as 'world-leading' or 'internationally excellent', ranking it 6th among UK university departments teaching archaeology and 1st for the public impact of its research.

The Institute of Learning Innovation within the University of Leicester is a research and postgraduate teaching group, directed by Grainne Conole. The institute has and continues to research on UK- and European-funded projects (over 30 as of August 2013), focusing on topics such as educational use of podcasting, e-readers in distance education, virtual worlds, open educational resources and open education, and learning design.

In 2019, the university of Leicester ranked 76th in Reuters top 100 of Europe's most innovative universities. University of Leicester excelled in molecular and cell biology.

Leicester has been ranked as one of the top performing universities in the UK for COVID-19 research, after being awarded more than £10.8 million of government funding since the pandemic began. The university now sits alongside the University of Oxford and University College London and has been recognised globally for its work, including being the first in the world to discover the link between people from black, Asian and minority ethnic (BAME) backgrounds being more susceptible to severe cases of coronavirus.

== Library special collections ==
=== Local history collections ===
The Library has one of the largest local history collections in the country. The main collection contains circa 37,000 items covering all the major counties of England. Much of this material has been collected for the Centre for English Local History since its founding in 1948. In addition, there are several rare book collections and archives:

- Hatton Collection. This collection is focused on the early English county histories and works by the antiquarians. Thomas Hatton (1876–1943), a local businessman whose collection of nearly 2,000 books on English local history was donated to the Library of Leicester College in 1920. This was one of the first major donations to the Library.
- Chaproniere Collection. Photographic archive of English parish churches organised by geological region. Donated by Donna Chaproniere.
- Fairclough Collection. Portrait prints and topographical illustrations of 17th century Britain. Donated by A. B. R. Fairclough in 1970.
- Thirsk Collection. Notes and data collected by Joan Thirsk for volumes 4 (1500–1640) and 5 (1640–1750) of The Agrarian History of England and Wales. Thirsk was the editor of these volumes and a research fellow at Leicester in the 1950s.

In recent years, the Library has digitised, and made available online, collections relating to local and urban history, including The Historical Directories of England and Wales and the East Midlands Oral History Archive.

=== Modern Literary Archives ===
The library also holds a number of collections of 20th century writers and illustrators:

- The Joe Orton Collection. Joe Orton (1933–1967) was a Leicester-born playwright, the collection contains his manuscripts and correspondence.
- The Laura Riding Letters. The collected correspondence of the American poet and critic Laura Riding (1901–1991).
- The Sue Townsend Collection. The personal papers of Sue Townsend (1946–2014). The collection contains Townsend's literary correspondence and notebooks detailing her works.

== Student life ==
The university has a number of different societies within its students' union. The Union has over 220 different societies.

=== Student media ===
The students' union has three student groups producing media: Leicester Student Magazine, Galaxy Radio, and LUST (Leicester University Student Television).

Leicester Student Magazine was founded in 1957, and has previously been known as The Ripple, The Wave & Galaxy Press.

LUST (Leicester University Student Television) was re-founded in 2002 after a period of dormancy. The station is affiliated to the National Student Television Association (NaSTA) and hosted the association's annual awards ceremony in 2008.

==== Galaxy Radio ====
Founded in 1996, Galaxy Radio (previously LUSH Radio, LUSH FM) is run and presented exclusively by students and broadcasts a mixture of music, chat and news. Some notable personalities from the early days of the station (LUSH FM at the time) who have gone on to work in the media are Lucy O'Doherty (BBC 6 Music) and Adam Mitchenall (ETV). Niraj Dave hosted a show on LUSH FM from 2007 to 2008 and has worked for Asian Sound Radio and Sunrise Radio, London, two of the largest British Asian radio stations in the country.

Galaxy Radio holds an annual 24-hour charity broadcast. In 2011, £300 was raised for Comic Relief. In 2013 the station held its first '69 Hour Broadcast', which raised over £450 for Comic Relief. For the 2018 fundraiser GR worked with fellow student group Leicester Marrow to raise £1,000 for Anthony Nolan.

Galaxy Radio has broadcast live the annual varsity match against De Montfort University for both football from the King Power Stadium and rugby union from Welford Road Stadium.

== Notable people ==
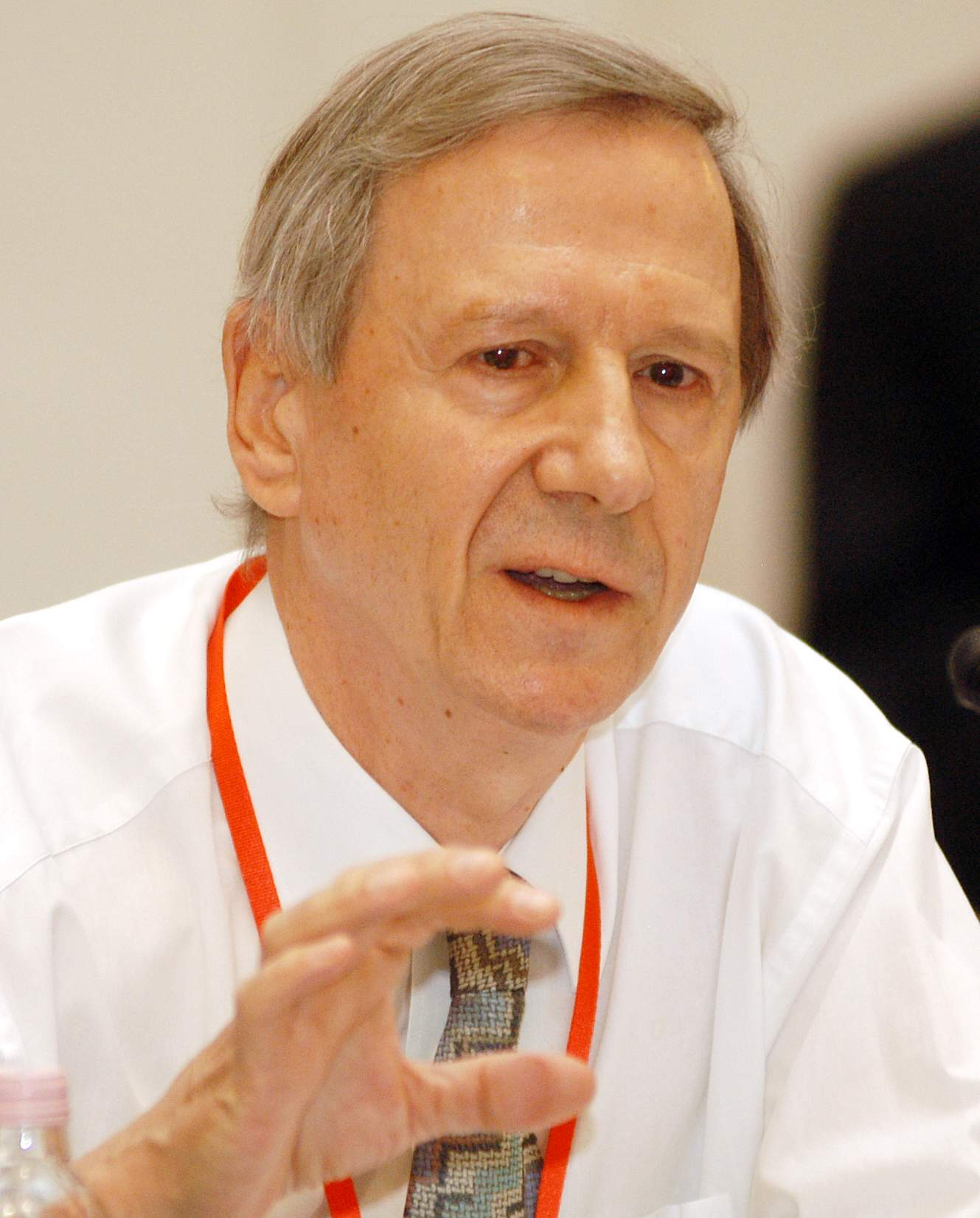
Anthony Giddens, sociologist

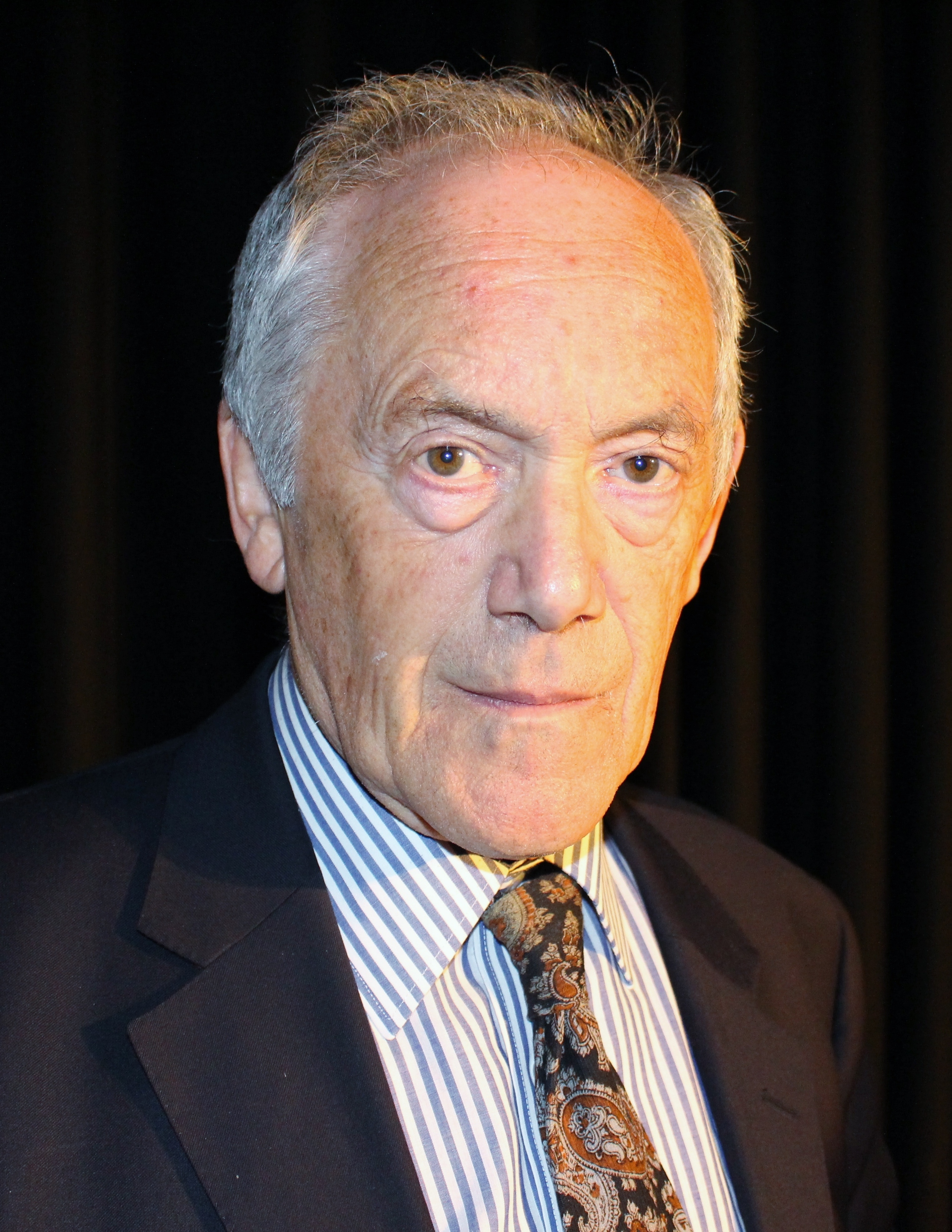
Peter Atkins, chemist

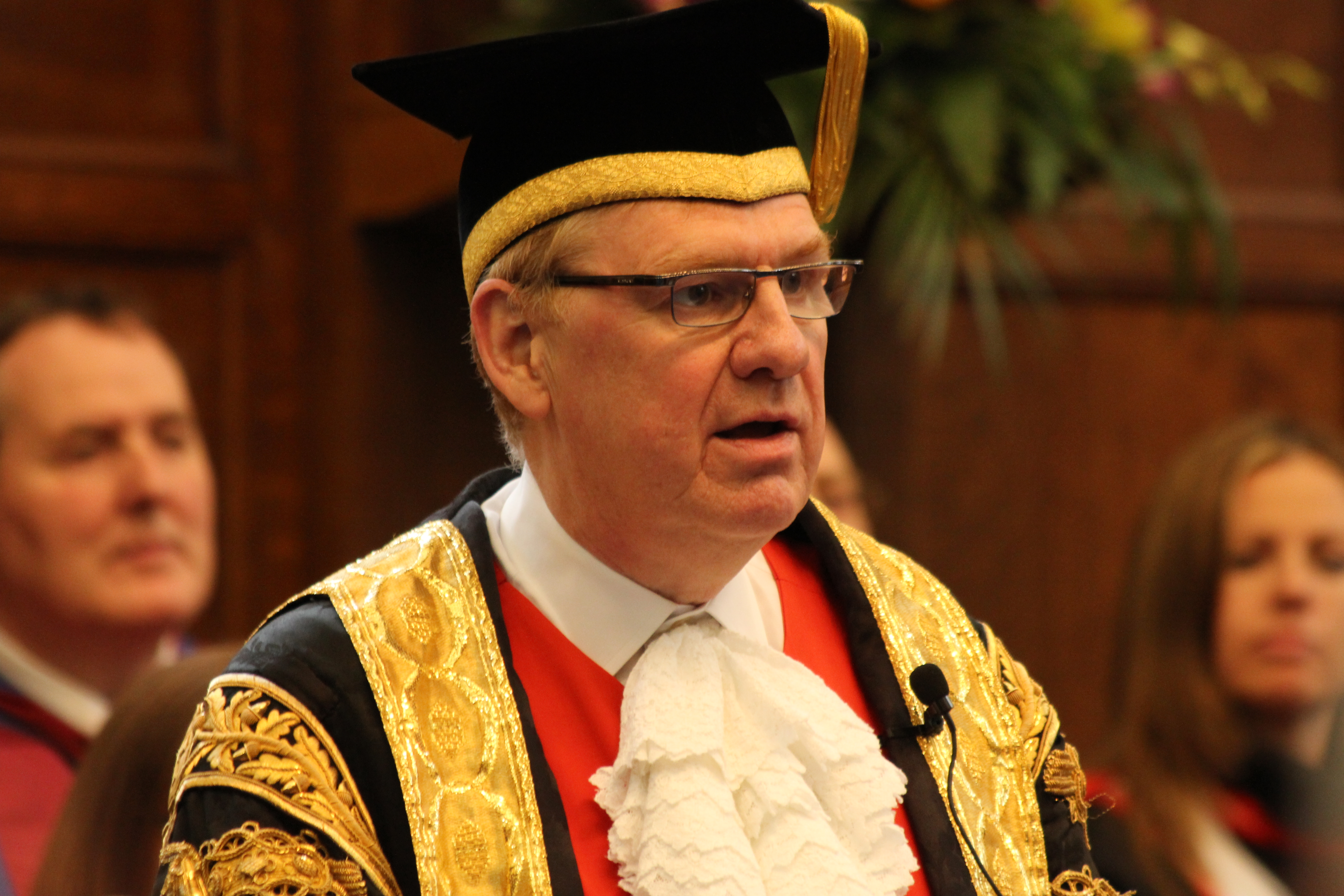
Sir Liam Donaldson, medical doctor and university chancellor

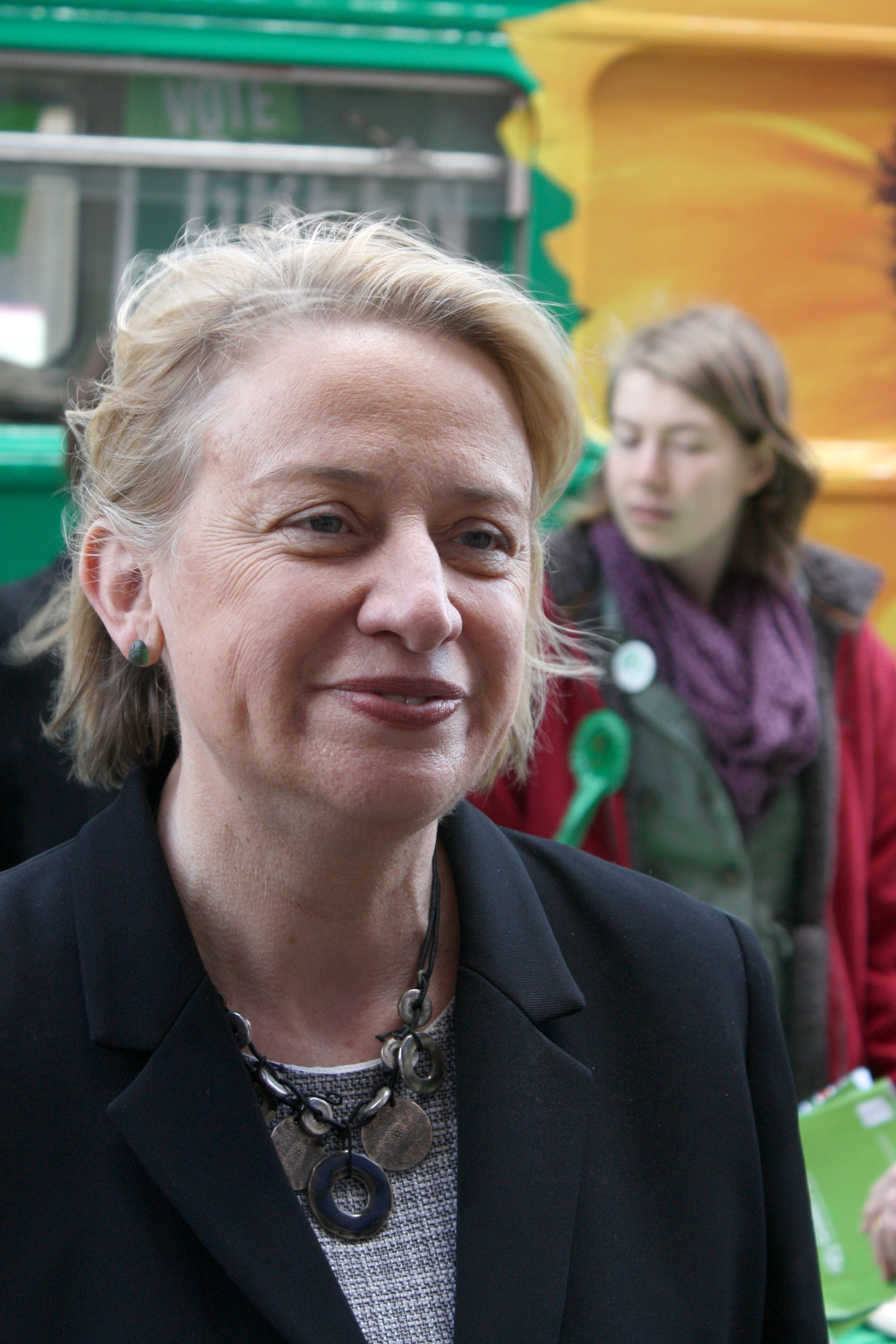
Natalie Bennett, British politician

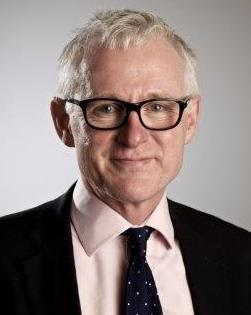
Norman Lamb, MP

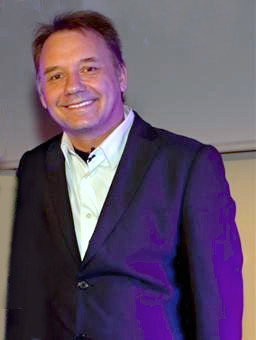
Bob Mortimer, comedian

Notable academics from the university include; Anthony Giddens, prominent sociologist who taught social psychology, Sarah Hainsworth, Professor of Materials and Forensic Engineering, involved in analysing the wounds on the skeleton of Richard III, Jeffrey A. Hoffman, NASA astronaut and physicist, Sir Alec Jeffreys, inventor of genetic fingerprinting; Philip Larkin, librarian and poet; Charles Rees, organic chemist; Lord Rees of Ludlow, the Astronomer Royal, visiting professor at Leicester; William Marshall, CEO of Planet. Jeremy Howick joined the University of Leicester as director of the new Stoneygate Centre for Excellence in Empathic Healthcare.

Numerous public figures in many diverse fields have been students at the university. Alumni in science include Peter Atkins, physical chemist; Philip Campbell, editor-in-chief of Nature; Sir Liam Donaldson, Chief Medical Officer.

Alumni in politics and government include Natalie Bennett, former leader of the Green Party of England and Wales; Atifete Jahjaga, President of Kosovo; Jyrki Katainen, Prime Minister of Finland; Norman Lamb, MP; Princess Mako of Akishino, a member of the Japanese Imperial Family; Aaron Porter, President, National Union of Students (United Kingdom) 2010–11; Peter Bedford, Member of Parliament for Mid Leicestershire; Jen Craft Member of Parliament for Thurrock; Edem Tengue, Togolese minister of maritime economy; Botsalo Ntuane, Botswana Leader of Opposition 2010-2012.

Alumni in the arts include Sir Malcolm Bradbury, author; Pete McCarthy, writer, broadcaster, comedian; Bob Mortimer, comedian; Bob Parr MBE, multi Emmy Award–winning television producer; C. P. Snow, author; Adele Parks, author; John Sutherland, Guardian columnist, Emeritus Professor of English Literature, University College London; author, television presenter and archaeologist John-Henry Phillips.

=== The Attenboroughs ===
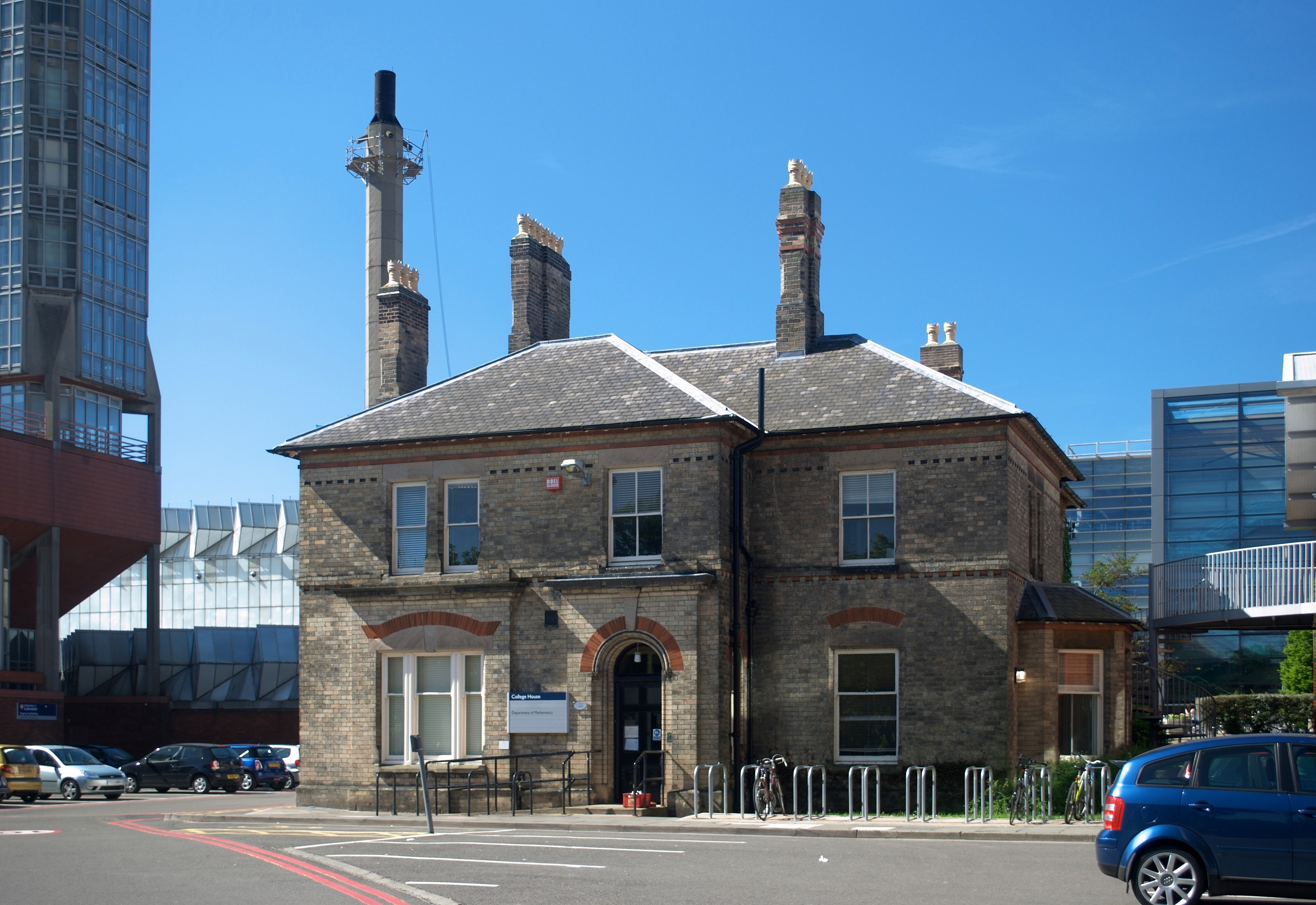
College House, childhood home of David and Richard Attenborough

The University of Leicester is commonly associated with the Attenborough family. Richard and David Attenborough (with their younger brother John) spent their childhood in College House, which is now home to part of the Engineering department (and is now near to the Attenborough tower, the tallest building on the campus and home to many of the arts and humanities departments). Their father Frederick Attenborough was Principal of the University College from 1932 until 1951. The brothers were educated at the adjacent grammar school before attending the Royal Academy of Dramatic Art and the University of Cambridge respectively.

Both have maintained links with the university – David Attenborough was made an honorary Doctor of Letters in 1970 and opened the Attenborough Arboretum in Knighton in 1997. In the same year, the Richard Attenborough Centre for Disability and the Arts was opened by Diana, Princess of Wales. Both brothers were made Distinguished Honorary Fellows of the university at the degree ceremony in the afternoon of 13 July 2006.

== See also ==
- Armorial of UK universities
- List of universities in the UK
- National Space Centre
- Peer English, an academic journal published by the Department of English
- Stanley Burton Centre for Holocaust Studies
- University of Leicester Botanic Garden
