= Peer English =

- Discipline: Literature
- Language: English
- Edited by: Barbara Cooke Michael Jolliffe Ben Parsons

Publication details
- History: 2006-present
- Publisher: University of Leicester (United Kingdom)

Standard abbreviations
- ISO 4: Peer Engl.

Indexing
- ISSN: 1746-5621

Links
- Journal homepage

Peer English is an academic journal established in 2006 and published annually by the Department of English at the University of Leicester and the English Association. Peer English exists "to interpret 'literary studies' as broadly as possible" with an "open and inclusive" approach and publishes "work that considers any literary period, and deploys the whole range of critical strategies used in the discipline today, from traditional close readings, to historically-grounded scholarship and cutting-edge theoretical or interdisciplinary analyses." The current editors are Barbara Cooke and Michael Jolliffe.
