= Institute of Learning Innovation =

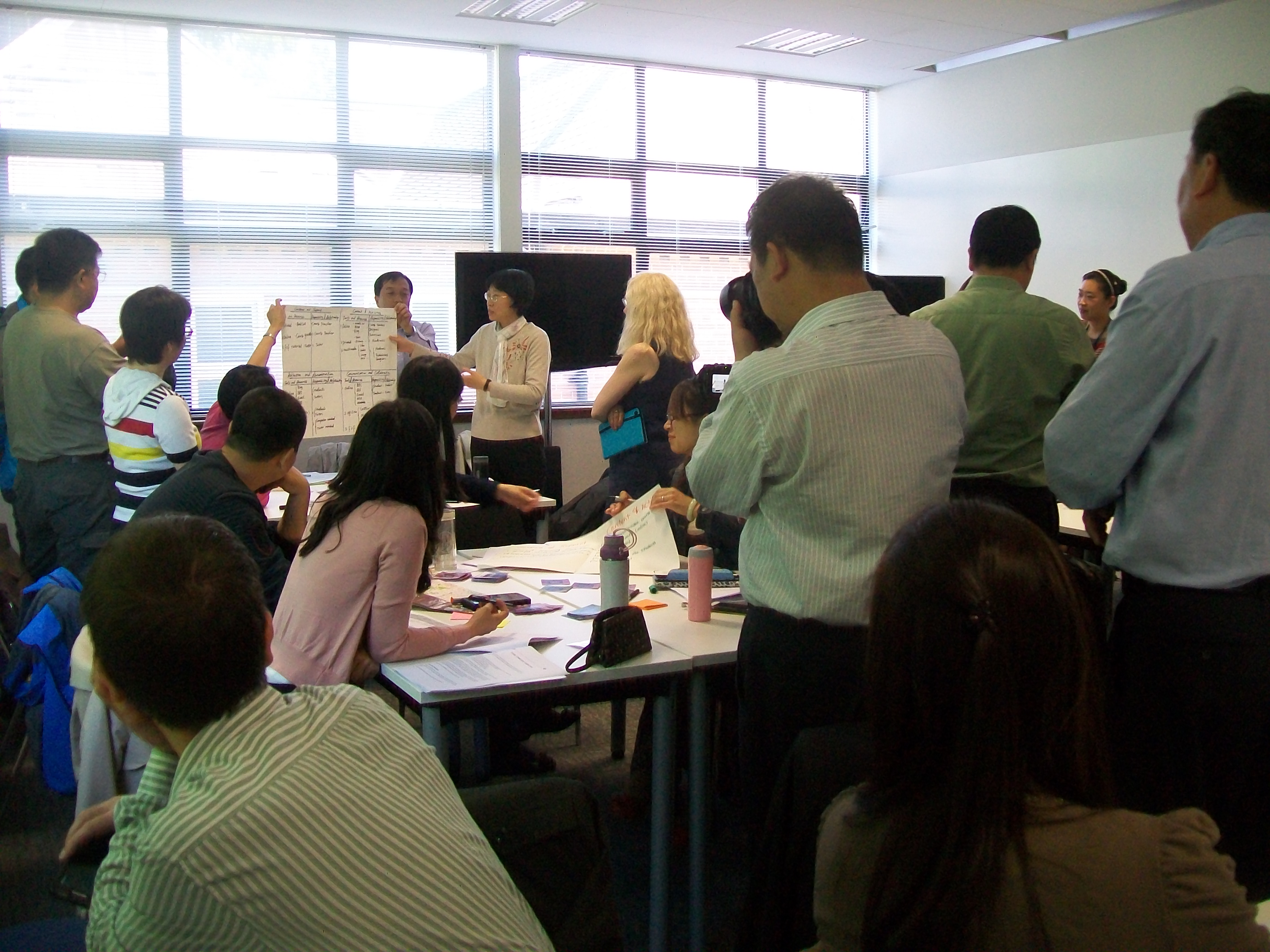
Participants from Open University China present their work in the 7Cs Learning Design Workshop with Institute of Learning Innovation

The Institute of Learning Innovation, formerly the Beyond Distance Research Alliance, was a teaching and research group based at the University of Leicester. It was founded by Professor Gilly Salmon, and directed by Professor Gráinne Conole. The Institute of Learning Innovation worked on numerous UK-based and European funded education research projects (over 30 as of August 2013) on topics around technology-enhanced education, and offered PhDs as well as an MSc in Learning Innovation by Distance Learning. Research topics have included educational use of podcasting, e-readers, virtual worlds, open educational resources and open education, and learning design.

The Media Zoo (now the Learning Innovation Studio), which is the dissemination and implementation arm of the Institute of Learning Innovation, was twice shortlisted as a Times Higher Education Outstanding ICT Initiative of the Year, first in 2007 and again in 2010.
