= Leicester University astronomical clock =

Modern astronomical clock at the University of Leicester

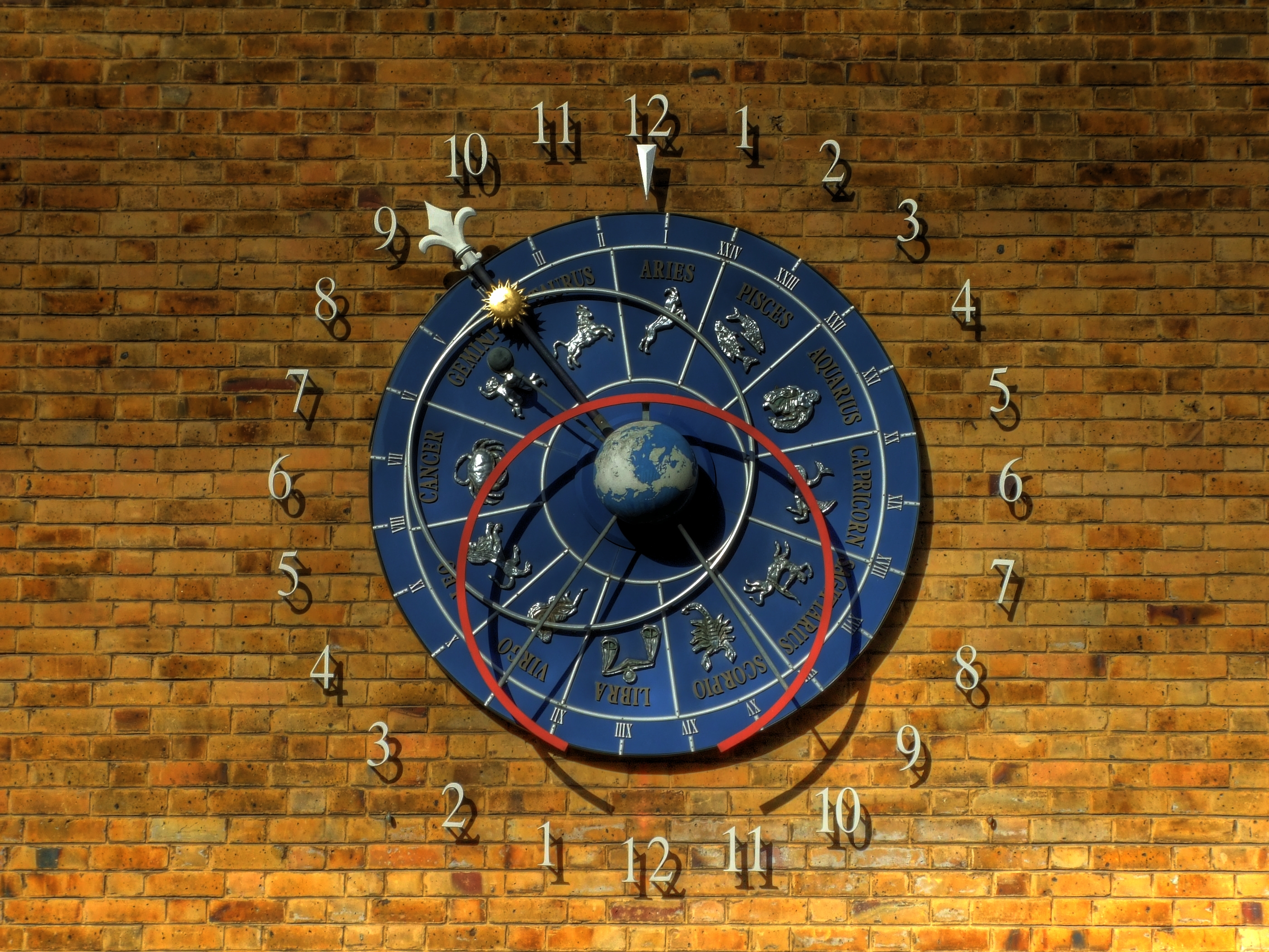
Leicester University Astronomical Clock

The Leicester University astronomical clock is a modern astronomical clock at the University of Leicester.

== History and description ==
The clock was installed in 1989 on the side of the Rattray Lecture Theatre at the University of Leicester. It was designed and constructed by Allan Mills and Ralph Jefferson.

The display is 8 feet (2.4 m) in diameter.
