= Gráinne Conole =

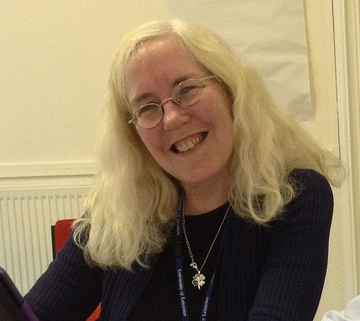
Professor Grainne Conole at the Institute of Learning Innovation, University of Leicester

Gráinne Conole is an Irish-born professor and educational researcher, based in England. She was Professor of Learning Innovation and Director of the Institute of Learning Innovation, University of Leicester. Prior to this, she was Professor of eLearning at the Institute of Educational Technology in the UK's Open University. Previously she had a chair in education at the University of Southampton and was also previously director of the Institute for Learning and Research Technology at the University of Bristol. Professor Conole was named an EDEN Fellow in 2013 and was awarded a National Teaching Fellowship from the Higher Education Academy and ASCILITE Fellow Award in 2012.

Born in Ireland, Conole later moved to London. She has two children.

== See also ==
- Gráinne (given name)
