= Parks, open spaces and nature reserves in the London Borough of Richmond upon Thames =

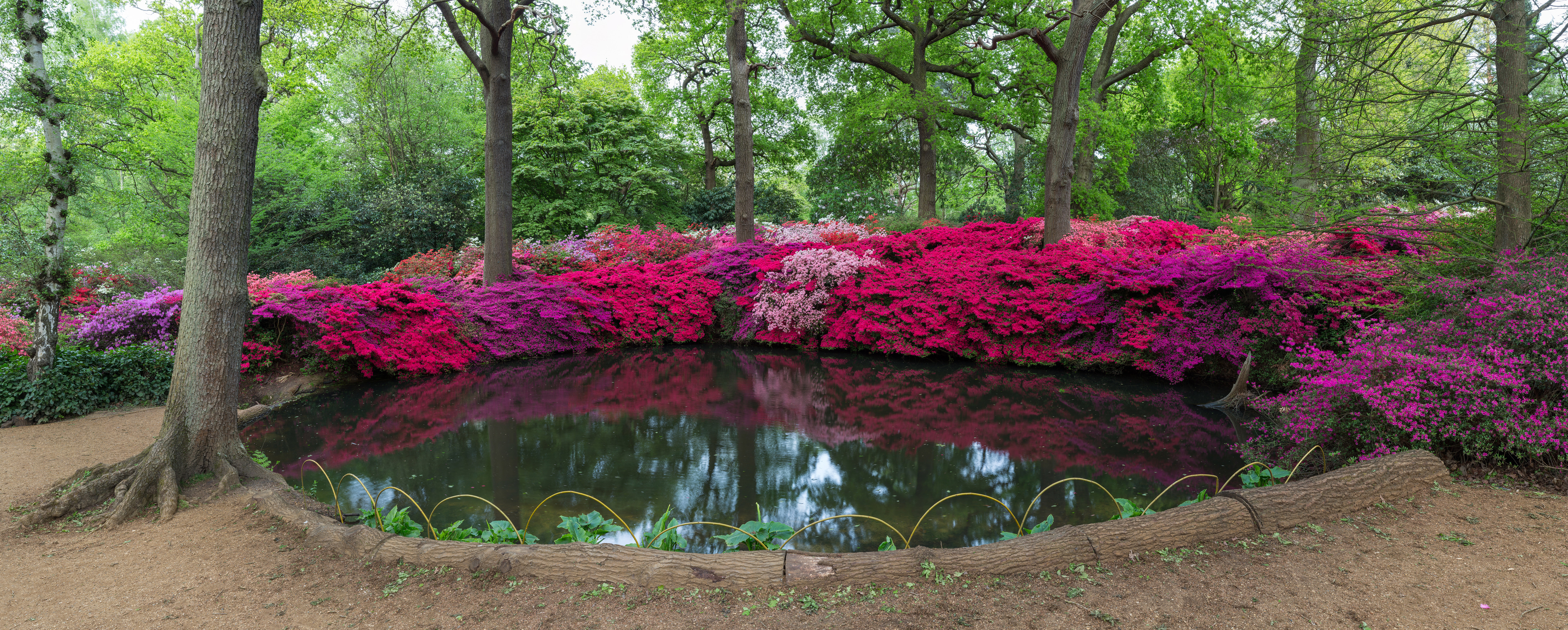
Isabella Plantation in bloom in May

Richmond upon Thames in the south west of Greater London has more parks, open spaces and nature reserves than any other London borough.

These include:

- Kew Gardens
- three Royal Parks – Richmond Park (which includes the Isabella Plantation), Bushy Park (which includes the Upper Lodge Water Gardens) and Hampton Court Park
- English Heritage's Marble Hill Park in Twickenham
- Thames Water's Sunnyside Reservoir
- The WWT London Wetland Centre

There are over 100 parks and open spaces within the borough's boundary and 21 miles of river frontage. Many of the open spaces were village greens.

The main parks and open spaces managed by Richmond upon Thames Borough Council are:

Name	Locality	Notes	Image
Barn Elms	Barnes	The site is split in two: the Barn Elms Sports Trust (BEST) fields and the Barn Elms Sports Centre.	
Barnes Common	Barnes	Local nature reserve	
Barnes Green	Barnes village		
Carlisle Park	Hampton		
Crane Park and Crane Park Island	From Twickenham to Hounslow Heath	The park north of the river is in the London Borough of Richmond upon Thames; south of the river it is in the London Borough of Hounslow. Crane Park is one of 11 parks in Greater London selected for renovation funds by a public vote. In 2009 the park received £400,000 towards better footpaths, more lighting, refurbished public toilets and new play areas for children.	
East Sheen Common	East Sheen	National Trust property, leased to the council	
Ham Common	Ham	Local nature reserve	
Ham Lands	Ham	Local Nature Reserve and Site of Metropolitan Importance for Nature Conservation	
Kew Green	Kew	Owned by the Crown Estate, it is leased to the council.	
Kneller Gardens	Whitton		
Lonsdale Road Reservoir	Barnes	It is also known as the Leg of Mutton Reservoir.	
North Sheen Recreation Ground	Kew		
Oak Avenue Local Nature Reserve	Hampton		
Old Deer Park	Richmond	Crown property, leased to the council. An area of open space 147 hectares (360 acres) of which 90.4 hectares (220 acres) are leased as sports grounds for sports, particularly rugby and golf. Despite the name, there are now no deer in the park.	
Palewell Common	East Sheen		
Petersham Meadows	Petersham	Water meadows that were originally part of the Ham House estate	
Pesthouse Common	Richmond		
Radnor Gardens	Strawberry Hill		
Richmond Green| Richmond	Crown property, leased to the council		
The Riverside	Richmond and Petersham	South of the Thames from Richmond Bridge	
Twickenham Green	Twickenham		
Westerley Ware	Kew	A small garden and recreation ground is at the foot of Kew Bridge, between Waterloo Place (a row of houses and flats off Kew Green) and the Thames riverbank. Historically common land, it has a memorial garden – bordered by hedges – to the fallen in the First World War, a grass area, three hard tennis courts and a children's playground. Since 1939 it has been managed by the local authority, which is now Richmond upon Thames Council.	
