= Protected view =

Scenic views not allowed to be blocked

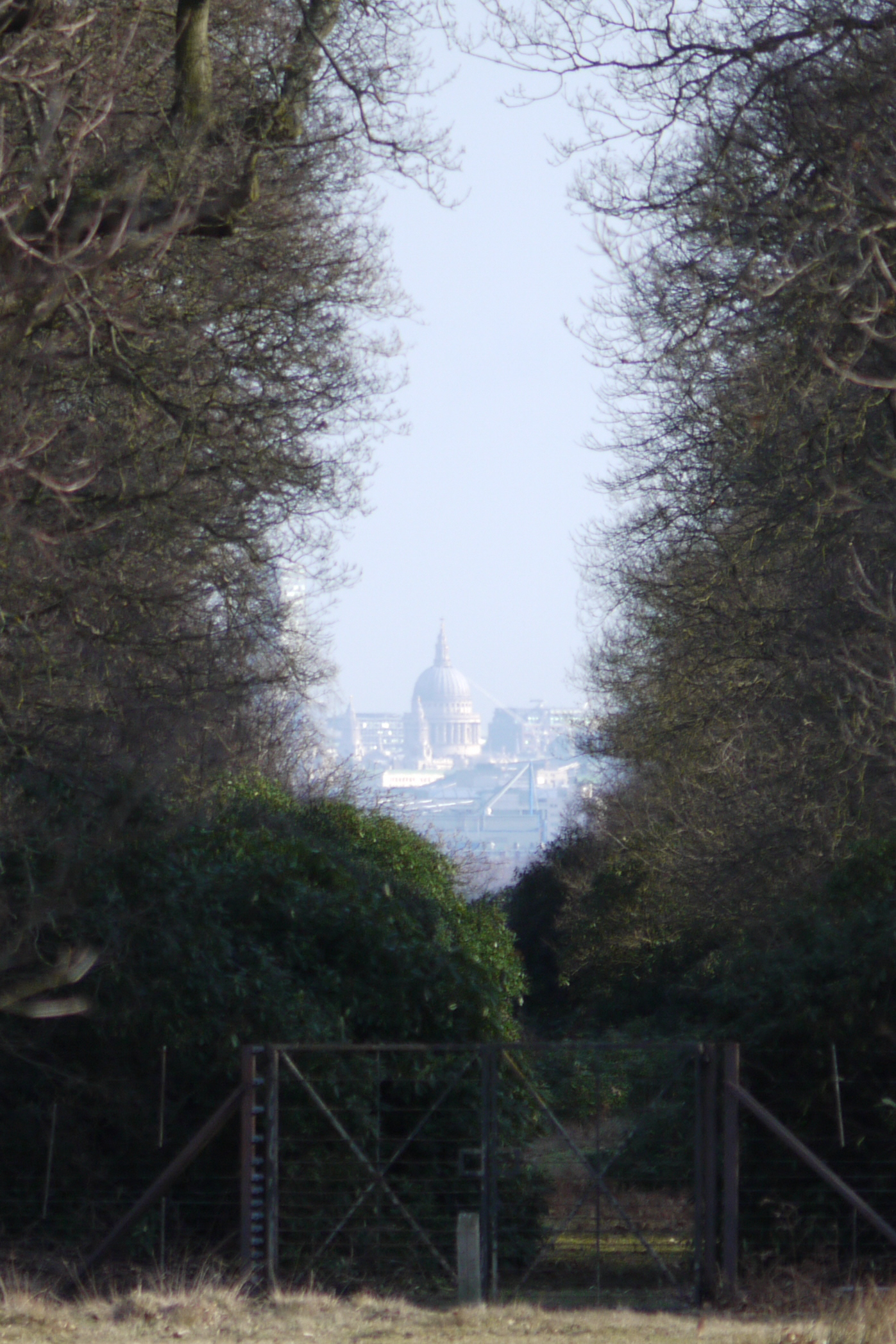
View of St Paul's Cathedral from King Henry's Mound (before the construction of Manhattan Loft Gardens behind the cathedral in 2016).

A protected view or protected vista is the legal requirement within urban planning to preserve the view of a specific place or historic building from another location. The effect of a protected view is to limit the height of new buildings within or adjacent to the sightline between the two places so as to preserve the ability to see the landmark as a focus of the view. The protection may also cover the area behind the place or building concerned.

In London, high-rise development is restricted at certain sites if it would obstruct protected views of St Paul's Cathedral and other historic buildings from various prominent locations around the city. This policy, known as 'St Paul’s Heights', has been in operation by the City of London since 1937. In Edinburgh, a 2005 skyline study compiled a list of almost 170 key views which are protected.

In the US, protected views exist in places such as San Francisco; Portland, Oregon where the size of downtown blocks is kept low to maintain the views of Mount Hood from the West Hills; and in Canada the city of Vancouver, British Columbia has protected "view cones". New York City only has a single protected view, at the Brooklyn Heights Promenade, and Austin, Texas has protected views of the State Capitol.

== Protected vistas in London ==
Map of the protected views in London (click for a hover-based interactive demonstration)

The thirteen vistas protected by the London View Management Framework are as follows:

- from Alexandra Palace to St Paul's Cathedral
- from the summit of Parliament Hill to St Paul's Cathedral
- from the summit of Parliament Hill to the Palace of Westminster
- from Parliament Hill, at the prominent oak tree east of the summit, to Palace of Westminster
- from the viewing gazebo at Kenwood House to St Paul's Cathedral
- from the summit of Primrose Hill to St Paul's Cathedral
- from the summit of Primrose Hill to the Palace of Westminster
- from Greenwich Park, north east of the General Wolfe statue, to St Paul's Cathedral
- from Point Hill Park, Blackheath, near the orientation board, to St Paul's Cathedral
- from Westminster Pier to St Paul's Cathedral
- from King Henry VIII's Mound in Richmond Park to St Paul's Cathedral

a distance of over 10 miles (16 km) and created in 1710, this view frames the cathedral through a special gap in holly hedging, down a specially maintained clear avenue in Sidmouth Wood and then all the way across London. This protected view has limited development around Liverpool Street Station as a tall structure there would form an unacceptable backdrop to the view of St Paul's. Construction of a new 42 storey building behind the cathedral was started in 2016, despite opposition from groups who claimed that this would spoil the view of the church.

- from the centre of the bridge over the Serpentine to the Palace of Westminster
- from The Queen's Walk at City Hall to the White Tower

The views of St Paul's Cathedral from Waterloo Bridge and Hungerford Bridge are not explicitly protected although they are protected in practice by the views from Richmond Park and from Westminster Pier respectively as these bridges are on the path of the protected vistas.
