= Manhattan Loft Gardens =

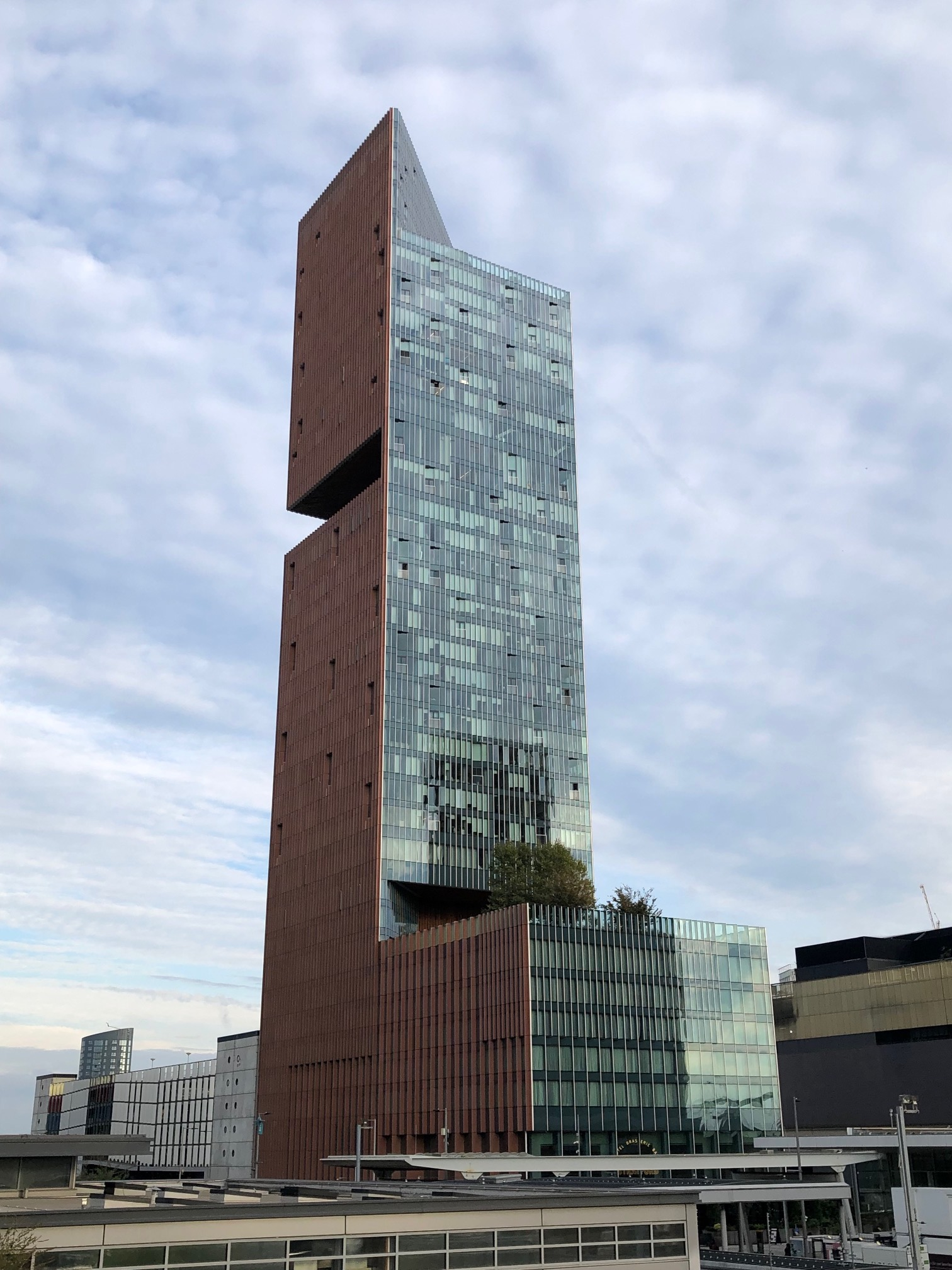
- Manhattan Loft Gardens in October 2025
- Interactive map of the Manhattan Loft Gardens area

General information
- Status: Completed
- Location: London E20, Stratford, England, UK
- Coordinates: 51.5452°N 0.0066°W
- Completed: 2018 (estimate)
- Client: Harry Handelsman and Manhattan Loft Corporation

Height
- Roof: 143 m (469 ft)

Technical details
- Floor count: 42

Design and construction
- Architect: Skidmore, Owings & Merrill
- Structural engineer: Skidmore, Owings & Merrill

Website
- www.thestratford.com

Manhattan Loft Gardens is a 42-storey 143 m (469 ft)-tall apartment building in Stratford, London. The architects and structural engineers are Skidmore, Owings & Merrill.

== Reception ==
On 5 December 2016, it was reported that the building had "destroyed" the protected view of St Paul's Cathedral from King Henry's Mound in Richmond Park, which had existed since 1710, when an avenue of trees was planted to frame the vista of the cathedral's dome. The developers responded that "despite going through the correct planning processes in a public and transparent manner, at no point was the subject of visual impact to St Paul's ever raised" by the Olympic Delivery Authority or the Greater London Authority and that they were looking into the issues raised by the development.
