= Richmond Park =

Royal Park in London, England

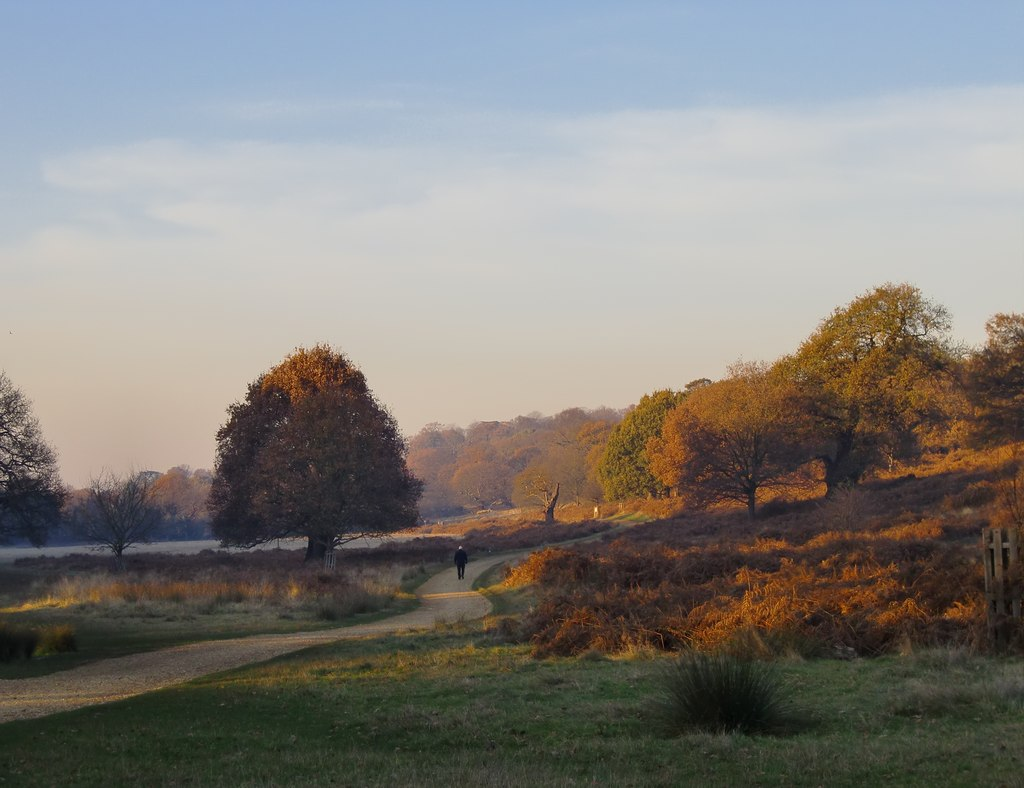
- Landscape and habitats in the park: woodland, bracken, and grassland at Ham Bottom
- Interactive map of Richmond Park
- Coordinates: 51°26′36″N 0°16′30″W
- Area: 2,360 acres (955 ha)
- Created: 17th century
- Operator: The Royal Parks
- Status: Open 24 hours year round except during the deer cull
- Website: www.royalparks.org.uk/parks/richmond-park

Designations

National Register of Historic Parks and Gardens
- Official name: Richmond Park
- Designated: 1 October 1987
- Reference no.: 1000828

Richmond Park
- Site of Special Scientific Interest
- Area of search: Richmond upon Thames, Greater London, England
- Grid reference: TQ2073
- Interest: Biological, historical
- Notification date: 1992

Richmond Park, in the London Borough of Richmond upon Thames, is the largest of London's Royal Parks and is of national and international importance for wildlife conservation. It was created by Charles I in the 17th century as a deer park. It is now a national nature reserve, a Site of Special Scientific Interest and a Special Area of Conservation and is included, at Grade I, on Historic England's Register of Historic Parks and Gardens of special historic interest in England. Its landscapes have inspired many famous artists and it has been a location for several films and TV series.

Richmond Park includes many buildings of architectural or historic interest. The Grade I-listed White Lodge was formerly a royal residence and is now home to the Royal Ballet School. The park's boundary walls and ten other buildings are Grade II-listed, including Pembroke Lodge, the home of 19th-century British Prime Minister Lord John Russell and his grandson, the philosopher Bertrand Russell. In 2020, Historic England listed two other features in the park – King Henry's Mound, possibly a round barrow, and an unnamed mound which could be a long barrow.

Historically the preserve of the monarch, the park is open for all to use and includes a golf club with two courses, and other facilities for sport and recreation. It played an important role in both world wars and the 1948 Summer Olympics and also featured in the 2012 Summer Olympics.

== Overview ==
=== Size ===
Richmond Park (856 hectares; 2,120 acres) is the largest of London's Royal Parks and the second-largest park in London after Lee Valley Park, whose linear-shaped area (4,000 hectares; 9,900 acres) extends beyond the M25 into Hertfordshire and Essex. It is Britain's second-largest urban walled park after Sutton Park (2,200 hectares; 5,400 acres) in Birmingham.

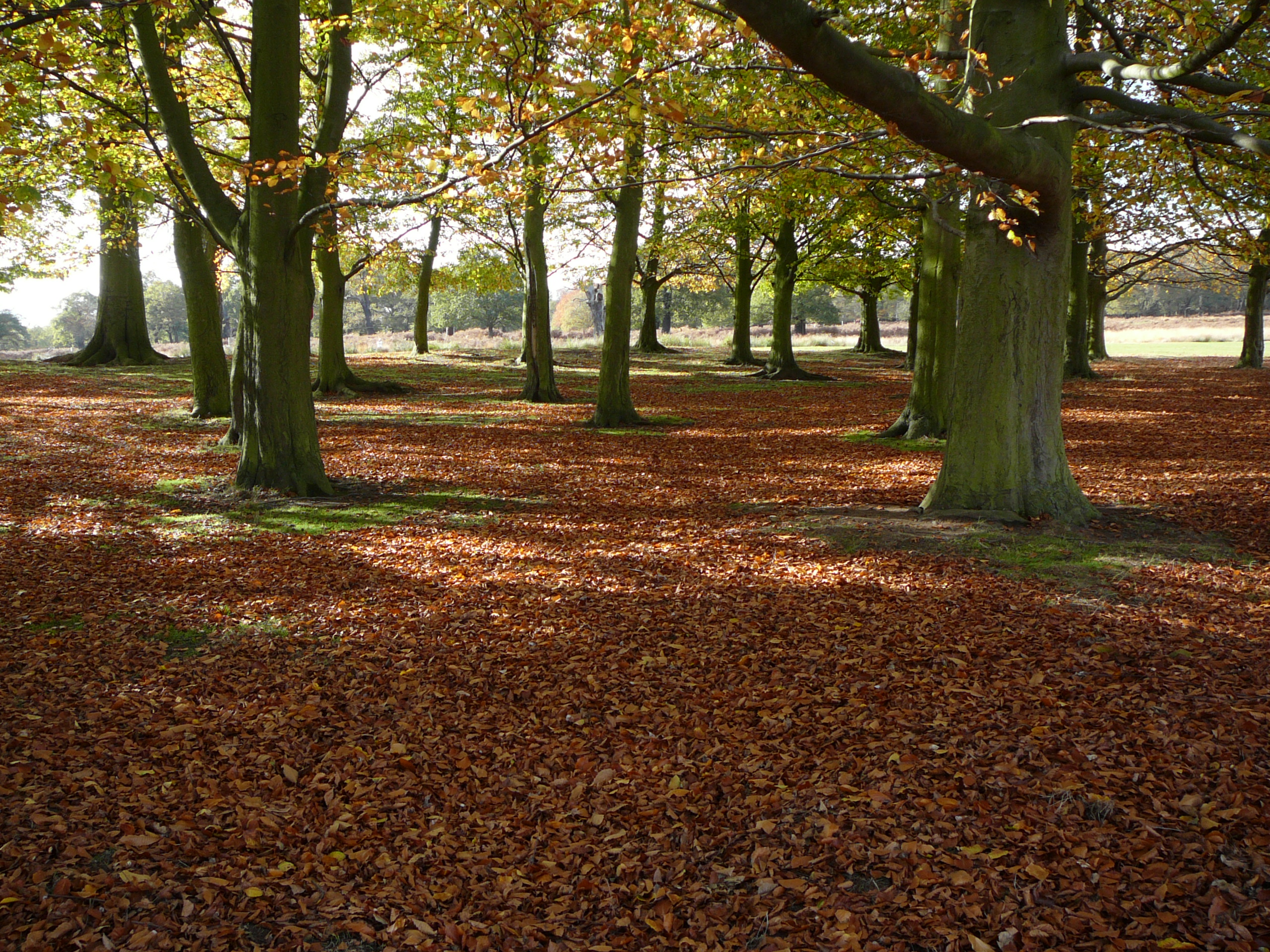
The park is a national nature reserve.

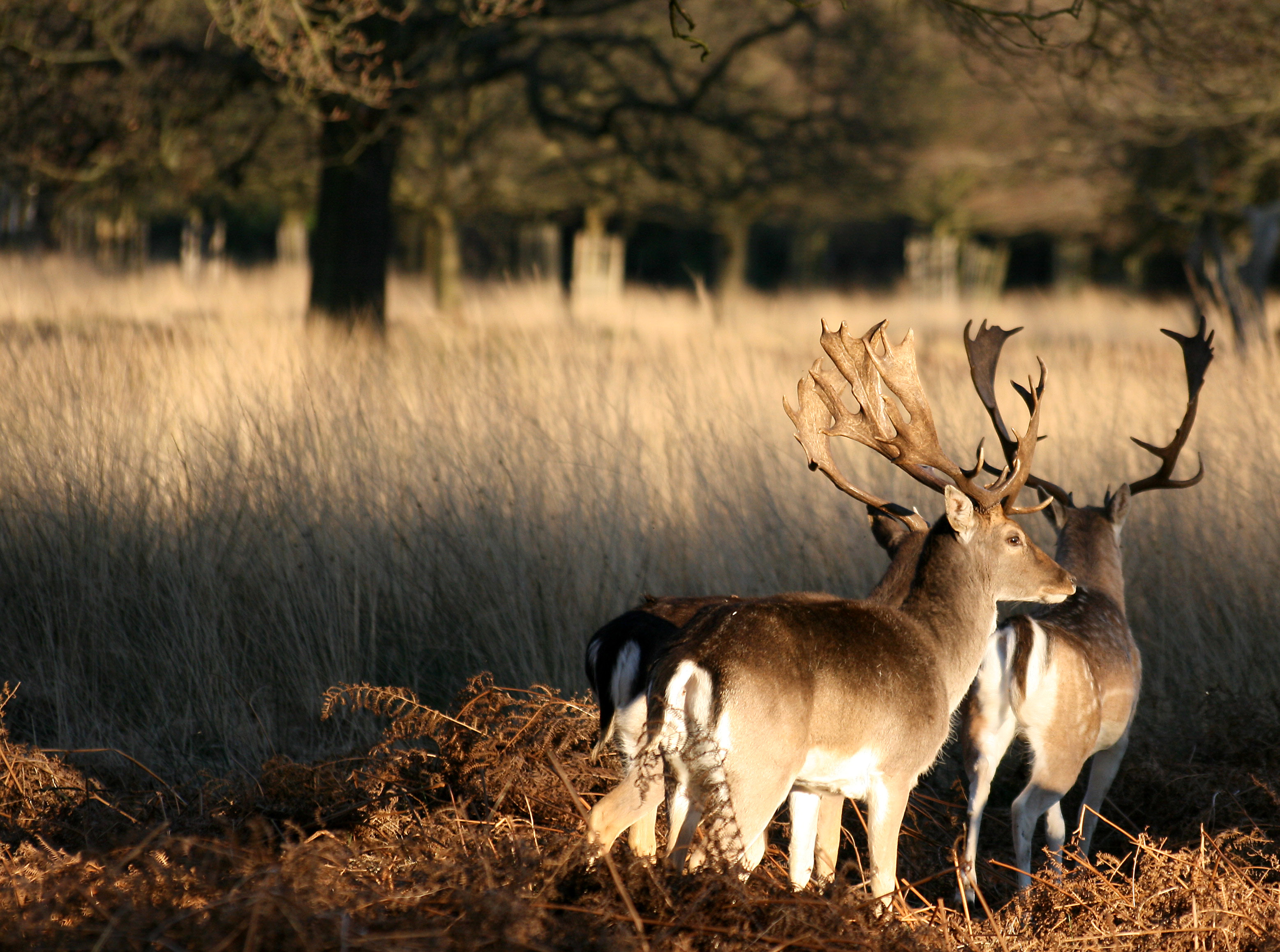
Fallow deer in the park

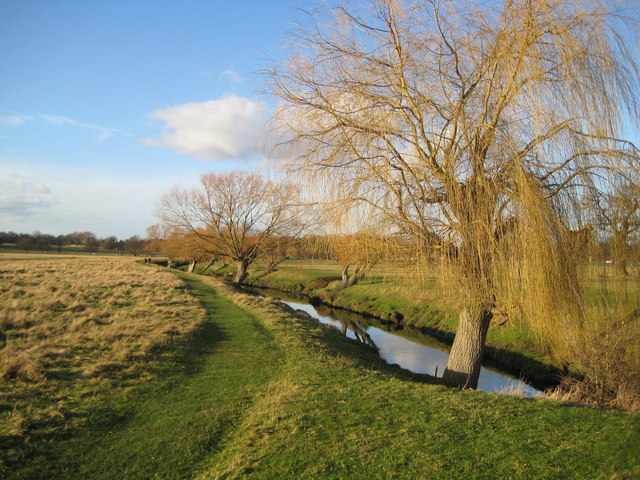
The Beverley Brook flows through the park.

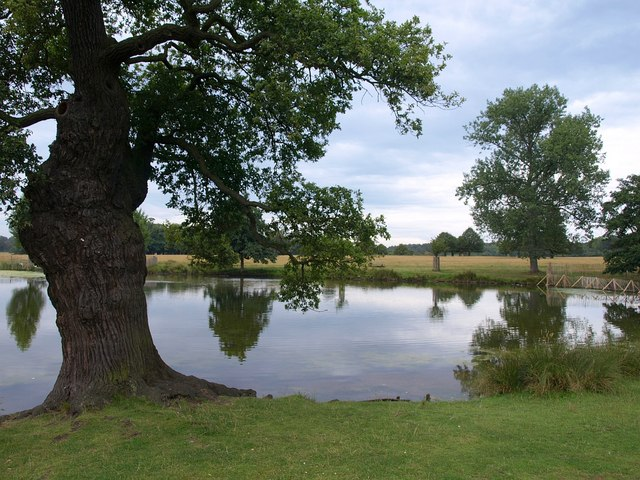
Adams Pond

=== Status ===
Of national and international importance for wildlife conservation, most of Richmond Park is a National Nature Reserve (NNR), and a Site of Special Scientific Interest (SSSI). The park, excluding the golf course, Pembroke Lodge Gardens and the Gate Gardens, was designated as an SSSI in 1992, the largest one in London. In its citation, Natural England said: "Richmond Park has been managed as a royal deer park since the seventeenth century, producing a range of habitats of value to wildlife. In particular, Richmond Park is of importance for its diverse deadwood beetle fauna associated with the ancient trees found throughout the parkland. In addition the park supports the most extensive area of dry acid grassland in Greater London."

The park was designated a Special Area of Conservation (SAC) in 2005, because it has "a large number of ancient trees with decaying timber. It is at the heart of the south London centre of distribution for stag beetle Lucanus cervus, and is a site of national importance for the conservation of the fauna of invertebrates associated with the decaying timber of ancient trees".

Since 1987 the park has been included, at Grade I, on the Register of Historic Parks and Gardens of Special Historic Interest in England. In its listing, Historic England describe it as "A royal deer park with pre C15 origins, imparked by Charles I and improved by subsequent monarchs. A public open space since the mid C19".

=== Geography ===
The park is in the London Borough of Richmond upon Thames. It is close to Richmond, Ham, Petersham, Kingston upon Thames, Wimbledon, Roehampton and East Sheen.

== Organisation ==
=== Governance ===
The Secretary of State for Digital, Culture, Media and Sport manages Richmond Park and the other Royal Parks of London under powers set out in the Crown Lands Act 1851, which transferred management of the parks from the monarch to the government. Day-to-day management of the Royal Parks has been delegated to The Royal Parks, an executive agency of the Department for Digital, Culture, Media and Sport (DCMS). The Royal Parks' Board sets the strategic direction for the agency. Appointments to the Board are made by the Mayor of London.

The Friends of Richmond Park and the Friends of Bushy Park co-chair the Richmond and Bushy Parks Forum, comprising more than 30 local stakeholder organisations. The forum was formed in September 2010 to consider proposals to bring Richmond Park and Bushy Park – and London's other royal parks – under the control of the Mayor of London through a new Royal Parks Board and to make a joint response. Although welcoming the principles of the new governance arrangements, the forum (in 2011) and the Friends of Richmond Park (in 2012) expressed concerns about the composition of the new board.

Richmond Park is in the London Borough of Richmond upon Thames, which is governed by Richmond upon Thames London Borough Council. Three local government wards cover the park: East Sheen; Ham, Petersham and Richmond Riverside; and South Richmond.

The park forms part of the Richmond Park constituency for the UK Parliament. The MP, since 2019, is Sarah Olney from the Liberal Democrats. Richmond Park is also part of the South West constituency for the London Assembly, which has been represented by Gareth Roberts from the Liberal Democrats since 2024.

=== Access ===
Richmond Park is the most visited royal park outside central London, with 4.4 million visits in 2014. The park is enclosed by a high wall with several gates. The gates either allow pedestrian and bicycle access only, or allow bicycle, pedestrian and other vehicle access. The gates for motor vehicle access are open only during daylight hours; the speed limit is 20 mph (32 km/h). The gates for pedestrians and cyclists are open 24 hours a day except during the deer culls in February and November, when the pedestrian gates are closed between 8:00 pm and 7:30 am. However, since 2020, there has been restricted through traffic in Richmond Park, for example between Richmond Gate and Roehampton Gate at weekends. Apart from taxis, no commercial vehicles are allowed unless they are being used to transact business with residents of the park.

From March to November, a free bus service, calling near Mortlake railway station, runs on Mondays, Wednesdays and Fridays. It stops at the park's main car parks and at the gate at Isabella Plantation nearest Peg's Pond.

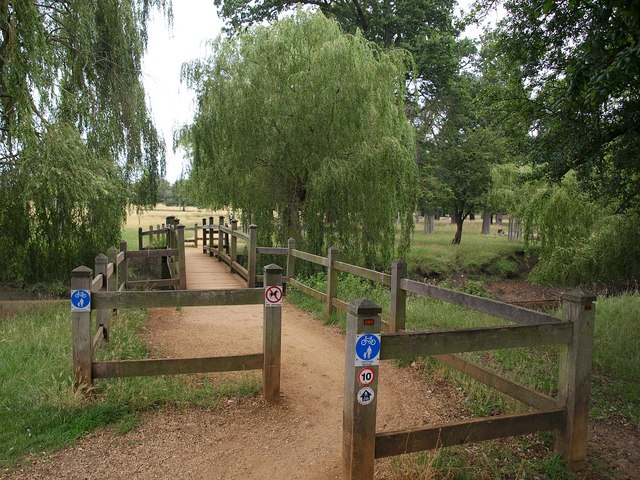
The shared-use cycle/footpath, between Roehampton Gate and Sheen Gate, crosses Beverley Brook amid willow trees.

The gates open to motor traffic are: Sheen Gate, Richmond Gate, Ham Gate, Kingston Gate, Roehampton Gate and (for access to Richmond Park Golf Course only) Chohole Gate. The park has designated bridleways and cycle paths. These are shown on maps and noticeboards displayed near the main entrances, along with other regulations that govern use of the park. The bridleways are for horses (and their riders) only and are not open to cyclists.

The Beverley Brook Walk runs through the park between Roehampton Gate and Robin Hood Gate. The Capital Ring walking route crosses the park from Robin Hood Gate to Petersham Gate.

Cycling is allowed only on main roads, on National Cycle Route 4 through the centre of the park and on the Tamsin Trail (the shared-use pedestrian–cycle path that runs close to the park's perimeter). National Cycle Route 4 crosses the park between Ham Gate in the west and Roehampton Gate in the east, skirting Pen Ponds and White Lodge. It interlinks with the Thames Cycle Route and forms part of the London Cycle Network. The speed limit on this route through the centre of the park, where it is off the main road, is 10 mph (16 km/h).

As the park is a national nature reserve and a Site of Special Scientific Interest, dog owners are required to keep their dogs under control while in the park. This includes not allowing their dog to disturb other park users or disrupt wildlife. In 2009, after some incidents leading to the death of wildfowl, the park's dogs-on-leads policy was extended. Park users are said to believe that the deer are feeling increasingly threatened by the growing number of dogs using the park and The Royal Parks advises against walking dogs in the park during the deer's birthing season.

=== Law enforcement ===
A mugging at gunpoint in 1854 reputedly led to the establishment of a park police force, which was originally mounted but has now been replaced by a patrol team in a four-wheel drive vehicle. Until 2005 the park was policed by the separate Royal Parks Constabulary, but that was subsumed into the Royal Parks Operational Command Unit of the Metropolitan Police. In 2015 the Friends of Richmond Park expressed concern about plans to cut the numbers of police in the park to half their level ten years previously, despite an increase in visitor numbers and in incidents of crime. In 2025, the Metropolitan Police disbanded the Royal Parks Police to save money.

=== Sport and recreation ===
The park has dedicated bridleways for horse-riding. Horses can be hired from local stables, including Operation Centaur based at Holly Lodge. The Tamsin Trail, shared between pedestrians and cyclists, is 7.2 miles (11.6 km) and provides a circuit of the park. It is almost entirely car-free and is popular with runners. Members of Barnes Runners complete at least one circumnavigation of it on the first and third Sunday of every month. Richmond Park parkrun, a 5-kilometre (3.1 mi) organised run, takes place every Saturday morning on a single-lap circular course which starts near Bishop's Gate. Cycles are available for hire near Roehampton Gate and, at peak times, near Pembroke Lodge. At Petersham Gate there is a children's playground which was renovated and upgraded in 2025.

Fishing is allowed, by paid permit, on Pen Ponds from mid-June to mid-March; the fish in the ponds include roach and bream. Golf is played at Richmond Park Golf Course, a public facility opened in 1923 by the Prince of Wales (later King Edward VIII). It has two 18-hole golf courses and practice facilities. A section of the grassland to the north of the Roehampton Gate is laid out during the winter months for rugby; there are three pitches. At weekends, this area is hired to the rugby union club Rosslyn Park F.C.. Visiting teams use the club's nearby clubhouse and changing rooms and are transferred by bus to and from the park pitches.

=== Friends of Richmond Park ===
Friends of Richmond Park
- Abbreviation: FRP
- Formation: 1961
- Registration no.: 1133201
- Legal status: registered charity
- Purpose: To conserve and protect Richmond Park and its peace and natural beauty for the benefit of the public and future generations, and to advance public education about the park
- Headquarters: Richmond, London
- Location: England, United Kingdom
- Members: 3,700
- Key people: Roger Hillyer, Chairman
- Main organ: Park Life (printed magazine, published twice a year)
- Staff: None
- Volunteers: 300
- Website: www.frp.org.uk

The Friends of Richmond Park was founded in 1961 to conserve and protect the park. In 1960 the speed limit in the park had been raised from 20 to 30 miles an hour and there were concerns that the park's roads would be assigned to the main highway system, as had recently happened in Hyde Park. In 1969, the Friends revealed plans by the then Greater London Council to assign the park's roads to the national highway; the plan was withdrawn. The speed limit was reduced to 20 miles an hour in 2004. The Friends has been a charitable organisation since 2009. (Note: The Friends of Richmond Park's charity registration number is 1133201.) It has 3,700 members, is run by approximately 300 volunteers and has no staff. Its patrons are broadcaster and naturalist David Attenborough, former Richmond Park MP Baroness Susan Kramer, broadcaster Clare Balding and radio and TV presenter Annabel Croft. The chairman, since 2021, is Roger Hillyer.

In 2011, the Friends successfully campaigned for the withdrawal of plans for open-air screenings of films in the park. In 2012, the Friends contributed towards the cost of a new Jubilee Pond, and launched a public appeal for a Ponds and Streams Conservation Programme. The Friends organise a programme of walks and education activities for young people, produce a quarterly newsletter, and run a visitor centre near Pembroke Lodge. Profits from sales of the Friends' books and other publications contribute towards its conservation work.

== History ==
=== Stuart origins ===
In 1625 Charles I brought his court to Richmond Palace to escape an outbreak of plague in London and turned the area on the hill above Richmond into a park for the hunting of red and fallow deer. It was originally called the King's "New Park" to distinguish it from an existing park nearby, now known as Old Deer Park. In 1637 he appointed Jerome Weston, 2nd Earl of Portland as keeper for life, with a fee of 12 (old) pence a day, pasture for four horses, and the use of the brushwood – later holders of that office were known as "Ranger". Charles's decision, also in 1637, to enclose the land (Note: An Ordnance Survey map, published in 1949 and now held at The National Archives (UK), shows contemporary features in Richmond Park alongside the place names and field boundaries that existed prior to the 1637 Enclosure Act.) was not popular with local residents, but he did allow pedestrians the right of way. The walls remain, partially rebuilt and reinforced. Following Charles I's execution, custodianship of the park passed to the Corporation of the City of London. It was returned to the restored monarch, Charles II, on his return to London in 1660.

=== Georgian alterations ===
In 1719, Caroline of Ansbach and her husband, the future King George II, bought Richmond Lodge as a country residence. This building had first been built as a hunting lodge for James I in 1619 and had been occupied by William III. As shown in a map of 1734, Richmond Park and Richmond Gardens then formed a single unit – the latter was merged with Kew Gardens by George III in the early 19th century. In 1736 the Queen's Ride was cut through existing woodland to create a grand avenue through the park and Bog Gate or Queen's Gate was opened as a private entrance for Queen Caroline to enter the park on her journeys between White Lodge and Richmond Lodge. The same map shows the two Pen Ponds, dug in 1746 and initially named the Canals. Richmond Lodge fell out of use on Caroline's death in 1737 but was brought back into use by her grandson George III as his summer residence from 1764 to 1772, when he switched his summer residence to Kew Palace and had Richmond Lodge demolished.

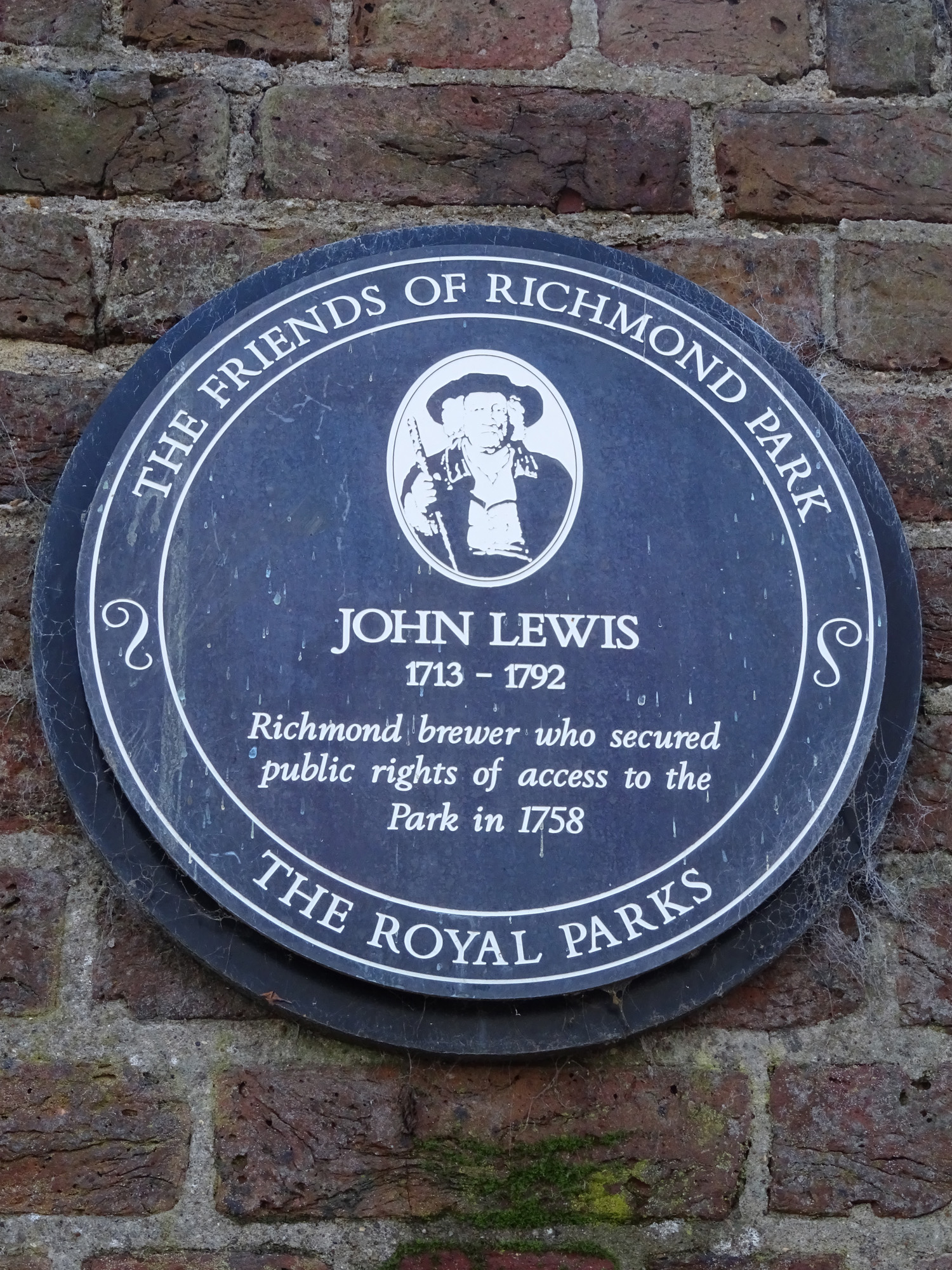
Plaque outside Sheen Gate to John Lewis, the Richmond brewer who secured public rights of access to the park in 1758

In 1751, Caroline's daughter Princess Amelia became ranger of Richmond Park after the death of Robert Walpole. Immediately afterwards, the Princess caused public uproar by closing the park to the public, only allowing a few friends and those with special permits to enter. This continued until 1758, when a local brewer, John Lewis, took the gatekeeper, who had stopped him from entering the park, to court. The court ruled in favour of Lewis, citing the fact that, when Charles I enclosed the park in the 17th century, he allowed the public right of way in the park. Princess Amelia was forced to lift the restrictions.

=== 19th century ===
Between 1833 and 1842 the Petersham Lodge estate, and then part of Sudbrook Park, were incorporated into Richmond Park. Terrace Walk was created from Richmond Gate to Pembroke Lodge. The Russell School was built near Petersham Gate in 1851. Between 1855 and 1861, new drainage improvements were constructed, including drinking points for deer. In 1867 and 1876 fallow deer from the park were sent to New Zealand to help build up stocks – the first fallow deer introduced to that country. In or around 1870, the Inns of Court Rifle Volunteers were using an area near Bog Gate as a drill ground. Full right of public access to the park was confirmed by Act of Parliament in 1872. The right to remove firewood was abolished.

Giuseppe Garibaldi, Italian general and politician, visited John Russell, 1st Earl Russell at Pembroke Lodge in 1864, as did the Shah of Persia, Naser al-Din Shah Qajar in 1873. He was the first modern Iranian monarch to visit Europe.

=== Early 20th century ===
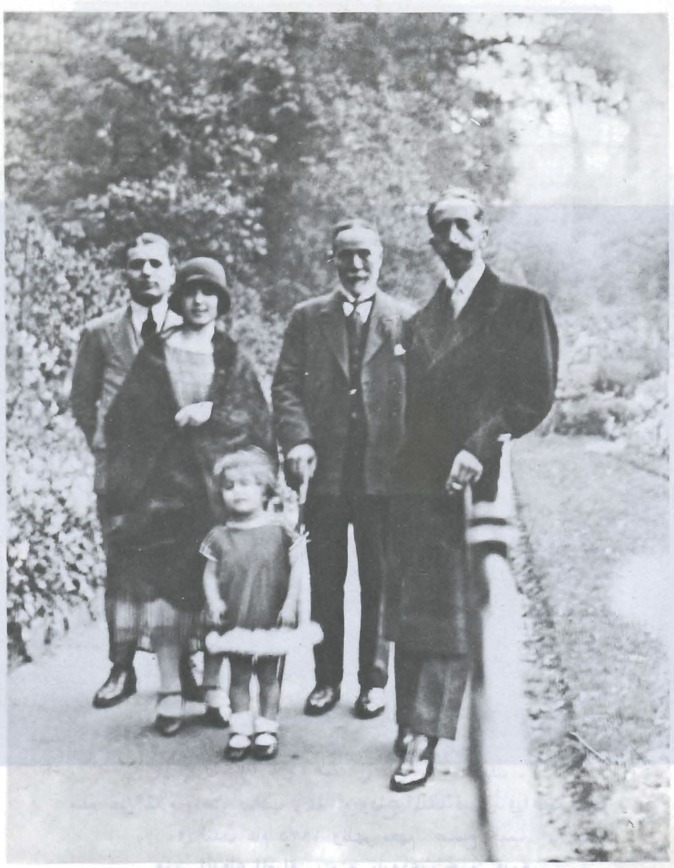
Salim Ali Salam with King Faisal I of Iraq in the park in 1925, with Salim's son Saeb Salam and daughters Anbara and Rasha

King Edward VII developed the park as a public amenity by opening up almost all the previously fenced woods and making public those gates that were previously private. From 1915 level areas of the park were marked out for football and cricket pitches. A golf course was developed on the former "Great Paddock" of Richmond Park, an area used for feeding deer for the royal hunt. The tree belt in this part of the park was supplemented by additional planting in 1936. The public golf course was opened in 1923 by Edward, Prince of Wales (who was to become King Edward VIII and, after his abdication, Duke of Windsor). The future king had been born in the park, at White Lodge, in 1894. In 1925, a second public 18-hole course was laid out to the south of the first (towards Robin Hood Gate); it was opened by the Duke of York (George VI). In honour of their respective openers, Richmond Park Golf Course's two courses are named the "Prince's" and the "Duke's".

The park played an important role during World War I and was used for cavalry training. On 7 December 1915 English inventor Harry Grindell Matthews demonstrated, in a secret test on Pen Ponds, how selenium cells would work in a remotely controlled prototype weapon for use against German Zeppelin airships. Reporting on this story several years later, in April 1924, The Daily Chronicle said that the test had been carried out in the presence of Arthur Balfour, Lord Fisher and a staff of experts. Its success led to Matthews receiving a payment of £25,000 from the Government the very next morning. Despite this large sum changing hands, the Admiralty never used the invention. Between 1916 and 1925 the park housed a South African military war hospital, which was built between Bishop's Pond and Conduit Wood. The hospital closed in 1921 and was demolished in 1925. Richmond Cemetery, just outside the park, contains a section of war graves commemorating 39 soldiers who died at the hospital; the section is marked by a Cross of Sacrifice and a Grade II listed cenotaph designed by Sir Edwin Lutyens.

=== World War II and its aftermath ===
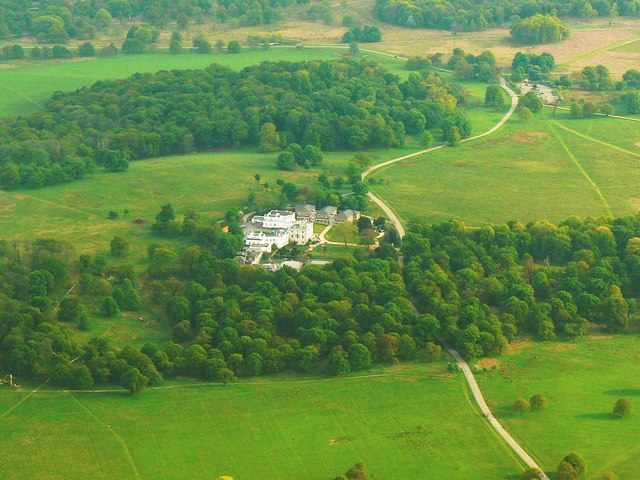
White Lodge from the air

An army camp was established in 1938. It covered 45 acres (18 ha) to the south and east of Thatched House Lodge, extending to the area south of Dann's Pond. It became known as Kingston Gate Camp and expanded the capacity of the East Surrey Regiment's regimental depot Infantry Training Centre (ITC). As a result, the ITC was better able to meet the demands of training new recruits and called-up militia between early 1940 and August 1941 when the ITC transferred to a facility in Canterbury shared with the Buffs (Royal East Kent Regiment). The camp was subsequently used as a military convalescent depot for up to 2,500 persons after which it continued as a base for the Auxiliary Territorial Service (ATS) until after the war.

During World War II Pembroke Lodge was used as the base for "Phantom" (the GHQ Liaison Regiment). The Pen Ponds were drained, to prevent their use as a landmark by the enemy, and an experimental bomb disposal centre was set up at Killcat Corner, which is between Robin Hood Gate and Roehampton Gate. Approximately 500 acres (200 ha) of the park was converted to agricultural use during the war.

An anti-aircraft gun site was inside Sheen Gate for the duration of the war. The Prime Minister, Winston Churchill, visited it on 10 October 1940 and it was featured in a photograph published in Picture Post on 13 December 1941. Associated with the gun site was the research site of the Army Operational Research Group, located on the polo field beside Sheen Cross, where Stanley Hey researched improvements to the operation of anti-aircraft gun-laying radar. During the war, Hey discovered that the Sun is a radio source and he investigated radio reflections from meteor trails, and radio noise from cosmic sources. In 1946 Hey's group discovered Cygnus A, later shown to be the first radio galaxy. The Richmond Park installation thus became the first radio observatory in Britain.

The Russell School (then located within the park's boundary) was destroyed by enemy action in 1943. A German bomb destroyed Sheen Cottage a year later.

John Boyd-Carpenter, MP for Kingston-upon-Thames, proposed using the Kingston Gate Camp to help alleviate the local post-war housing shortage but the Minister of Works, Charles Key, was opposed, preferring that the site be eventually returned to its former parkland use. Key's department refurbished and repurposed the camp as an Olympic Village for the 1948 Summer Olympics. The Olympic Village was opened by Olympic gold medallist Lord Burghley, with Key making the announcement, in July 1948. After the Olympics, the camp was used by units of the Royal Corps of Signals and then by the Women's Royal Army Corps following their formation in 1949 as successor to the wartime Auxiliary Territorial Service (ATS). The camp remained in military use and was used to house service families repatriated following the Suez Crisis in 1956; it was demolished in 1965, and the area was reintegrated into the park in the following year.

=== Late 20th century – present ===
The Petersham Hole was a sink hole caused by sewer subsidence, forcing the closure of the A307 road in Petersham in 1979–80. Traffic was diverted through the park and the Richmond, Ham, and Kingston gates remained open day and night. The park road was widened at Ham Cross near Ham Gate to accommodate temporary traffic lights. About 10 deer a month were killed by traffic while the diversion was in operation.

When the present London Borough of Richmond upon Thames was created in 1965, it included most of the park. The eastern tip, including Roehampton Gate, belonged to the London Borough of Wandsworth, and the southern tip was in the Royal Borough of Kingston upon Thames. Following borough boundary changes in 1994 and 1995, the whole park became part of Richmond upon Thames.

In the 2012 Summer Olympics the men's and the women's cycling road races went through the park.

Actor Joseph A. Bennett died by suicide in the park on 13 April 2015, reportedly found hanged from a tree.

== Features ==
=== Boundary wall ===
The brick wall enclosing Richmond Park is eight miles (13 km) long and up to 9 ft (2.7 m) high. Much of it is designated by Historic England as a Grade II listed building.

=== Gates ===
==== Six original gates ====
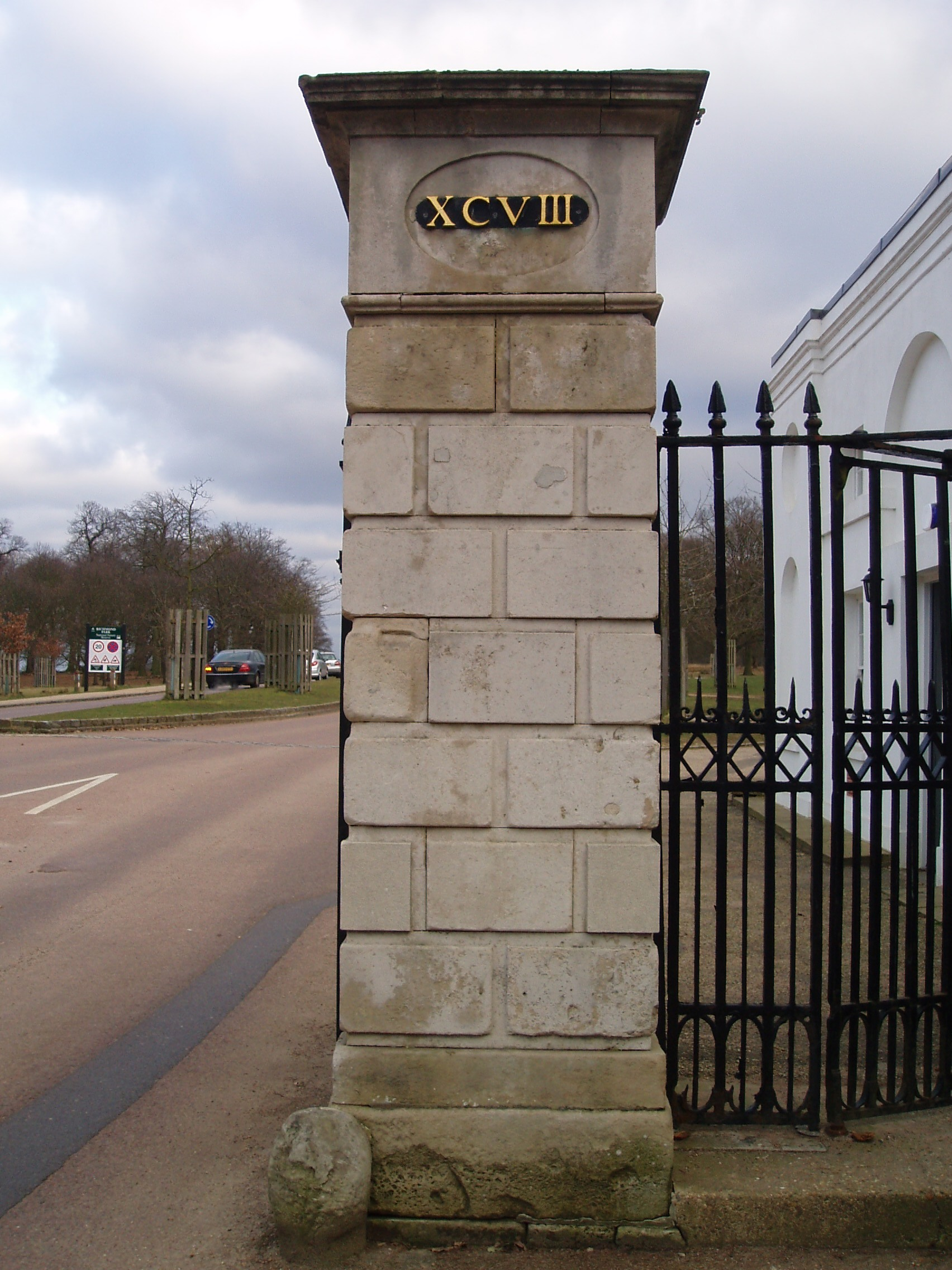
Richmond Gate, designed by Sir John Soane

When the park was enclosed in 1637 there were six gates in the boundary wall: Coombe Gate, Ham Gate, Richmond Gate, Robin Hood Gate, Roehampton Gate and Sheen Gate. Of these, Richmond Gate has the heaviest traffic. The present gates were designed by Sir John Soane and were widened in 1896. Sheen Gate was where the brewer John Lewis asserted pedestrian right of entry in 1755 after Princess Amelia had denied it. The present double gates date from 1926. Coombe Gate (later known as Ladderstile Gate) provided access to the park for the parishioners of Coombe, with both a gate and a stepladder. The gate was locked in the early 1700s and bricked up in about 1735. The stepladder was reinstated after John Lewis's case in 1758 and remained in place until about 1884. The present gate dates from 1901. The present wrought iron gates of Roehampton Gate were installed in 1899. Ham Gate was widened in 1921, when the present wrought iron gates were installed. One of the wrought iron gates was replaced in 2024 after a car crashed into it. The chinoiserie lantern lights over the gate were installed in 1825.

Robin Hood Gate takes its name from the nearby Robin Hood Hotel, (a pub demolished in 2002) and is close to what is called the Robin Hood roundabout on the A3. Widened in 1907, it has been closed to motorised vehicles since a 2003 traffic reduction trial. Work started in 2013 to make the gates more suitable for pedestrian use and return some of the hard surface to parkland.

==== Other gates ====
Chohole Gate served the farm that stood within the park on the site of the present Kings Farm Plantation. It is first mentioned in 1680. Kingston Gate dates from about 1750. The existing gates date from 1898. Bog Gate, or Queen's Gate, which connects the park with East Sheen Common, was built in 1736. Public access to the park via this gate, 24 hours a day, was granted in 1894 and the present "cradle" gate was installed. Petersham Gate served the Russell School, replacing the more ornate gates to Petersham Lodge. A disused carriage gate further up the hill was probably a tradesman's entrance to the school or to the Lodge stables. Bishop's Gate in Chisholm Road, previously known as the Cattle Gate, was for use by livestock allowed to pasture in the nineteenth century. It was opened for public use in 1896. Kitchen Garden Gate, hidden behind Teck Plantation, is probably a nineteenth-century gate. It has never been open to the public. Cambrian Gate or Cambrian Road Gate was constructed during World War I for access to the newly built South African Military Hospital. When the hospital was demolished in 1925, the entrance was made permanent, with public access, as a pedestrian gate.

=== Buildings ===
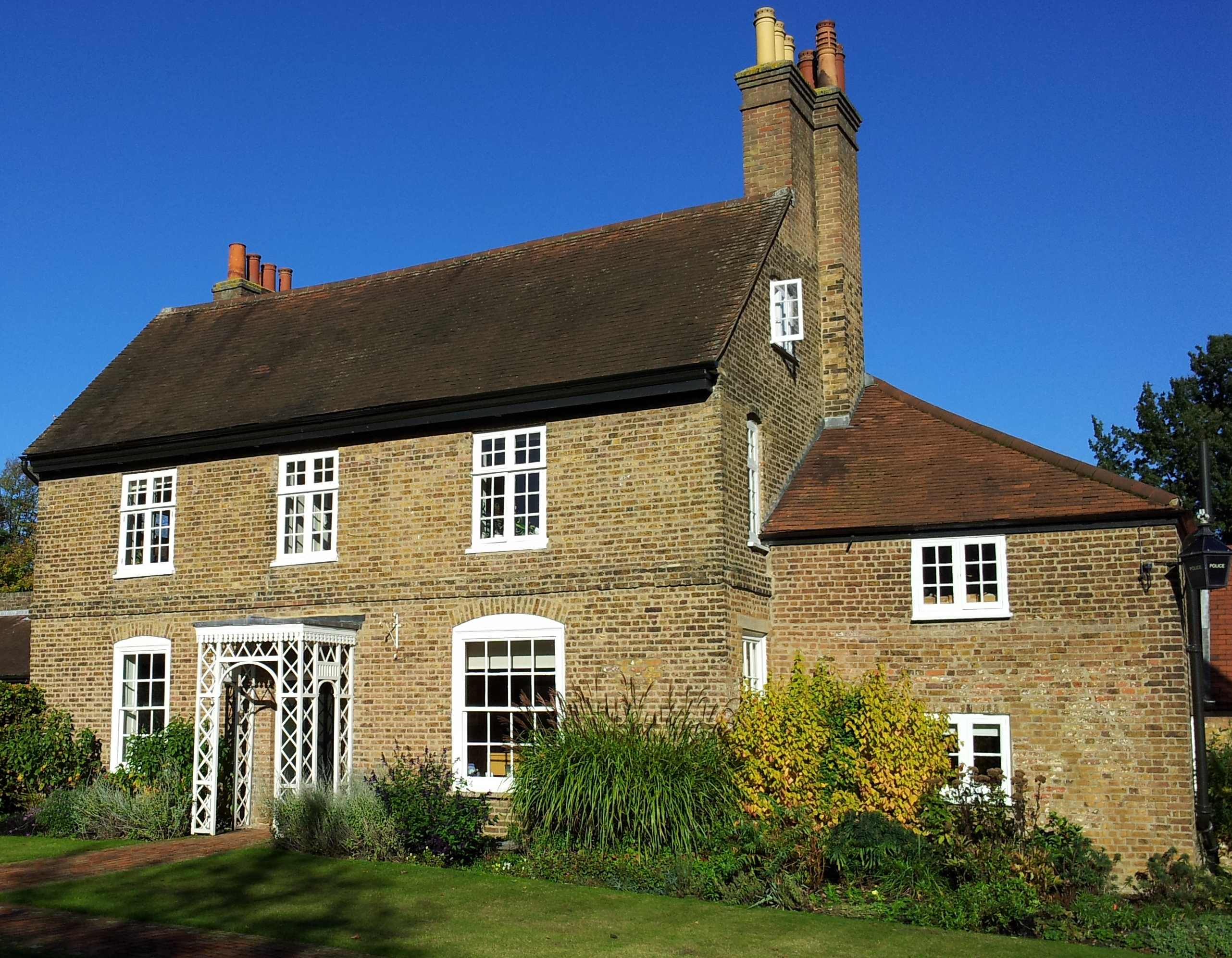
Holly Lodge

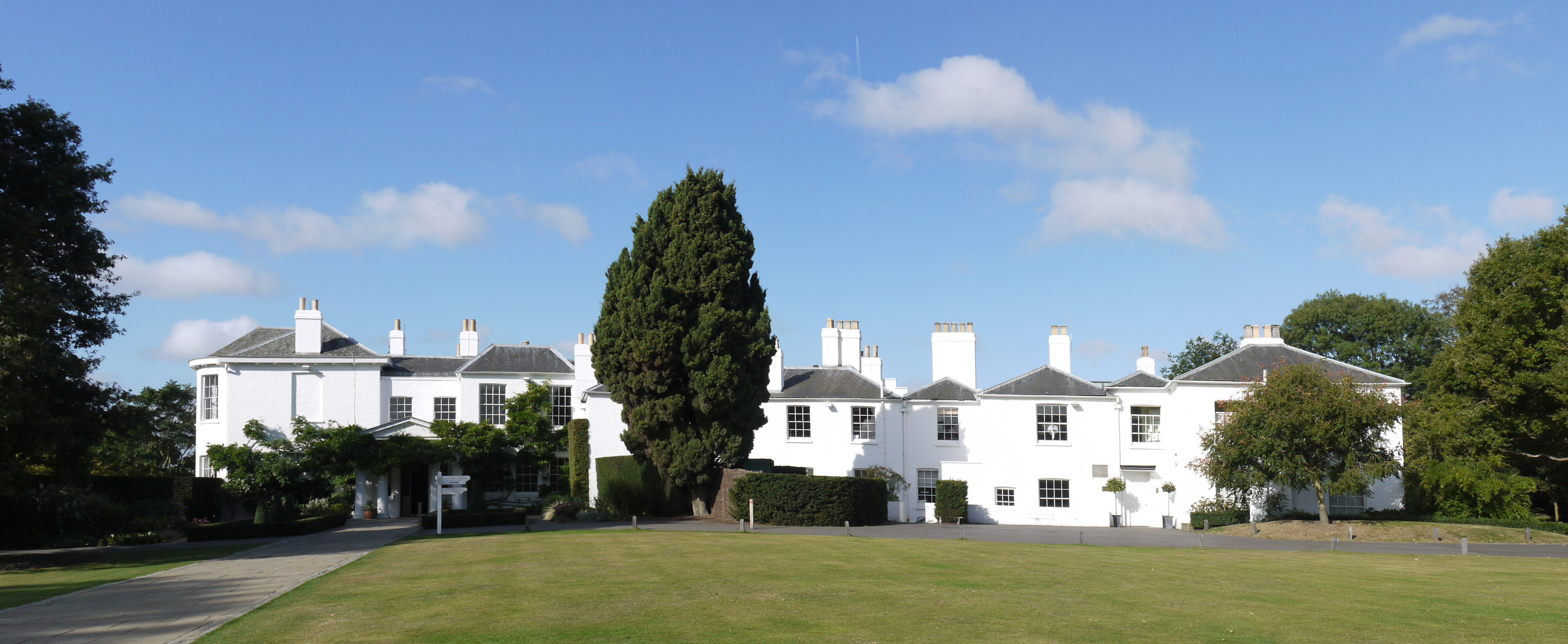
Pembroke Lodge

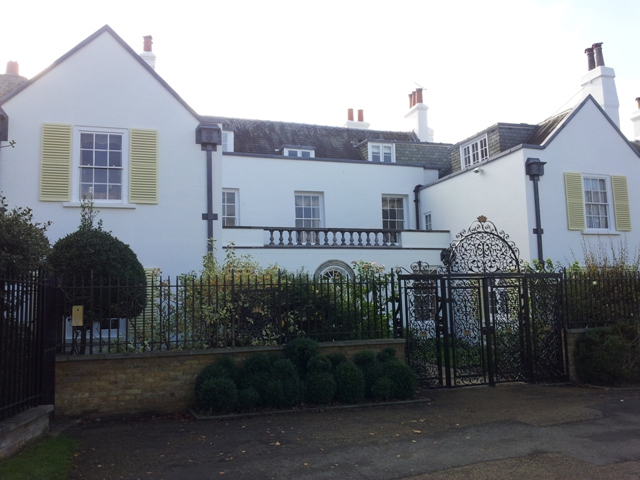
Thatched House Lodge

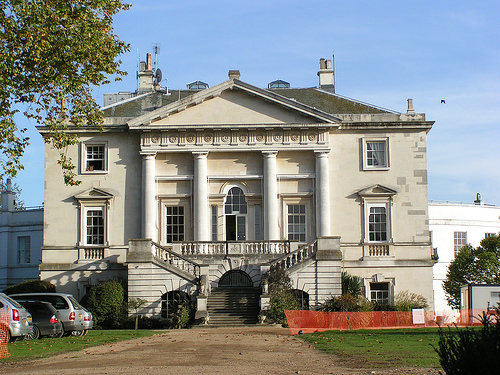
White Lodge

The park includes a Grade I listed building, White Lodge. The park's boundary wall is Grade II listed, as are ten other buildings: Ham Gate Lodge, built in 1742; Holly Lodge (formerly known as Bog Lodge) and the game larder in its courtyard, built in 1735; Pembroke Lodge; Richmond Gate and Richmond Gate Lodge, dated 1798 and designed by Sir John Soane; Thatched House Lodge; and White Ash Lodge and its barns and stables, built in the 1730s or 1740s.

The freebord or "deer leap" is a strip of land 5 metres (16 feet 5 inches) wide, running around most of the perimeter of the park. Owned by the Crown, it allows access to the outside of the boundary wall for inspection and repairs. Householders whose property backs on to the park can use this land by paying an annual fee.

==== Lodges ====
Pembroke Lodge stands in its own garden within the park. In 1847, it became the home of the then Prime Minister, Lord John Russell, and from 1876 to 1890 was the childhood home of his grandson, Bertrand Russell. It is now a self-service restaurant and a venue for weddings and other events.

Thatched House Lodge was the London home of United States General Dwight D. Eisenhower during the Second World War. Since 1963 it has been the residence of Princess Alexandra. It was originally built as two houses in 1673 for two Richmond Park Keepers, as Aldridge Lodge, and was enlarged in 1727, possibly by William Kent, as a home for Sir Robert Walpole, Britain's first prime minister. The gardens include an 18th-century two-room thatched summer house which gave the main house its name.

White Lodge was built in 1730 as a hunting lodge for George II by the architect Roger Morris. Its many famous residents have included members of the Royal Family. The future king Edward VIII was born at White Lodge in 1894; his brother Prince Albert, Duke of York (the future George VI) and the Duchess of York (later Queen Elizabeth the Queen Mother) lived there in the 1920s. In 1953 President Tito of Yugoslavia stayed at White Lodge during an official visit to Britain. The Royal Ballet School (formerly Sadler's Wells Ballet) has been based since 1955 at White Lodge, where younger ballet students continue to be trained.

Oak Lodge, near Sidmouth Wood, was built in about 1852 as a home for the park bailiff, who was responsible for repair and maintenance in the park. It is used by The Royal Parks as its base for a similar function today. There are gate lodges at Chohole Gate, Kingston Gate, Robin Hood Gate, Roehampton Gate and at Sheen Gate, which has a bungalow (Sheen Gate Bungalow). Ladderstile Cottage, at Ladderstile Gate, was built in the 1780s.

==== Holly Lodge ====
Cooper's Lodge was built on the site of Hill Farm in 1735. It was renamed Lucas's Lodge in 1771, Bog Lodge in the 1790s and Holly Lodge in 1993.

Holly Lodge includes the Holly Lodge Centre, a registered charity (Note: The Holly Lodge Centre's charity registration number is 1076741.) which provides an opportunity for everyone to learn from hands-on experiences, focusing particularly on the environment and in the Victorian history and heritage of Richmond Park. The centre, which is wheelchair-accessible, was opened in 1994. It was founded by Mike Fitt, who was then The Royal Parks' superintendent of Richmond Park and later became deputy chief executive of London's Royal Parks. The Holly Lodge Centre received the Queen's Award for Voluntary Service in 2005. In 2011, Princess Alexandra, the Centre's royal patron, opened its Victorian-themed pharmacy, Mr Palmer's Chymist. This includes the original interior, artefacts and dispensing records dating from 1865, from a chemist's shop in Mortlake, and is used for educational activities. The centre includes a replica Victorian schoolroom, a kitchen garden planted with varieties of vegetables used in Victorian times and herbs cultivated for their medicinal properties, and a nature trail named after Sir David Attenborough.

==== Former buildings ====
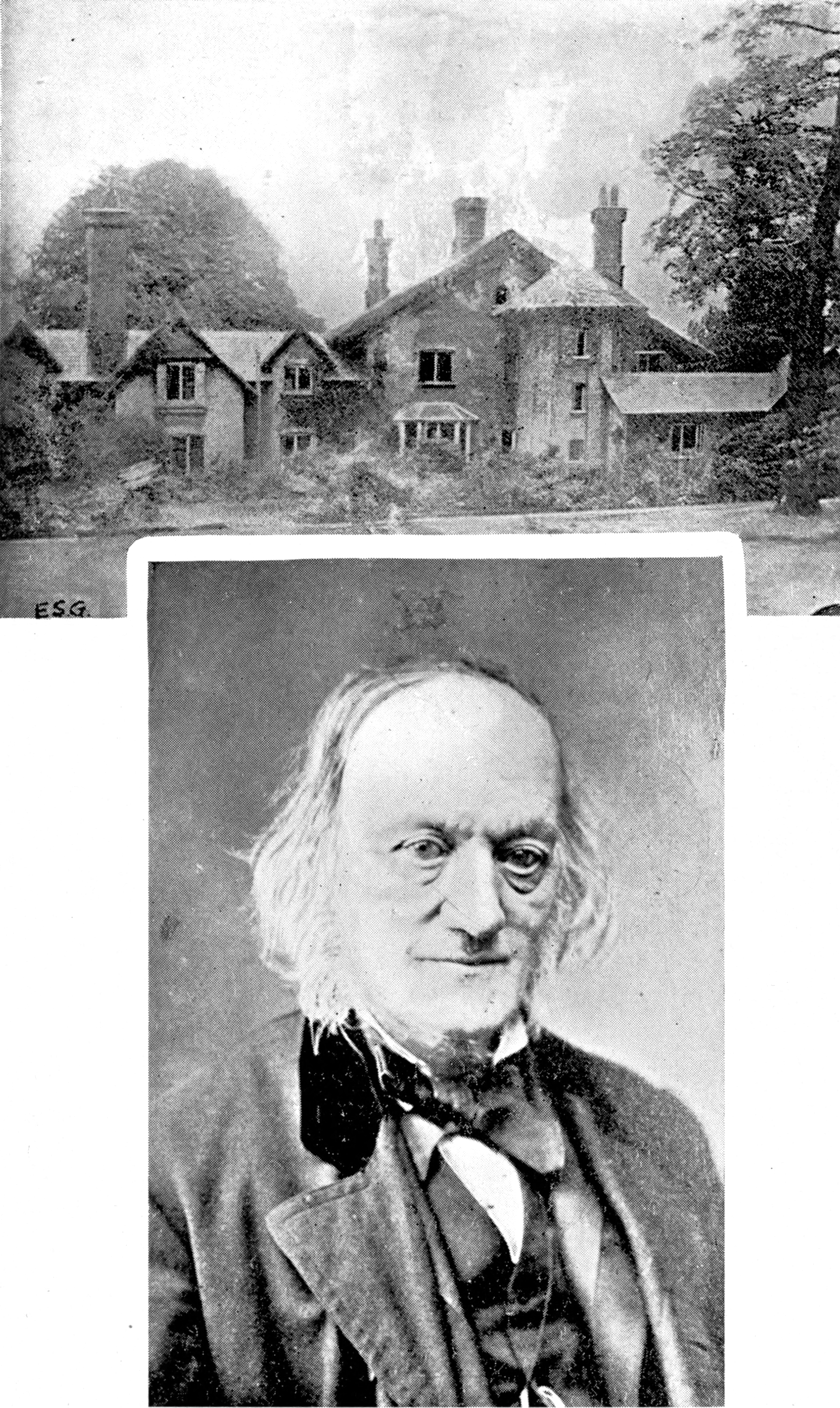
Sheen Cottage (above) and Sir Richard Owen

A 1754 map by John Eyre, "Plan of His Majesty's New Park", shows a summer house near Richmond Gate. Several buildings already existed within the park when it was created. One of these was a manor house at Petersham which was renamed Petersham Lodge. During the Commonwealth period it became accommodation for one of the park's deputy keepers, Lodowick Carlell (or Carlile), who was a renowned playwright in his day, and his wife, Joan Carlile, one of the first English women to practise painting professionally.

Elizabeth, Countess of Dysart, and her husband Sir Lionel Tollemache took over Petersham Lodge when they became joint keepers of Richmond Park. After Tollemache's death the Lodge and its surrounding land were leased in 1686 to Laurence Hyde, 1st Earl of Rochester, whose sister Anne was married to the new king, James II. It became a private park and was subsequently landscaped. By 1692 Rochester had demolished the Lodge and replaced it with a splendid new mansion in his "New Park". In 1732, a new Petersham Lodge was built to replace it after a fire. This Petersham Lodge was demolished in 1835.

Professor Sir Richard Owen, the first director of the Natural History Museum, lived at Sheen Cottage until his death in 1892. The cottage was destroyed by enemy action in 1944. Traces of it can be seen in patches and irregularities in the wall 220 metres from Sheen Gate.

A bandstand, similar to one in Kensington Gardens, was erected near Richmond Gate in 1931. In 1975, after many years of disuse, it was moved to Regent's Park.

=== Viewpoints ===
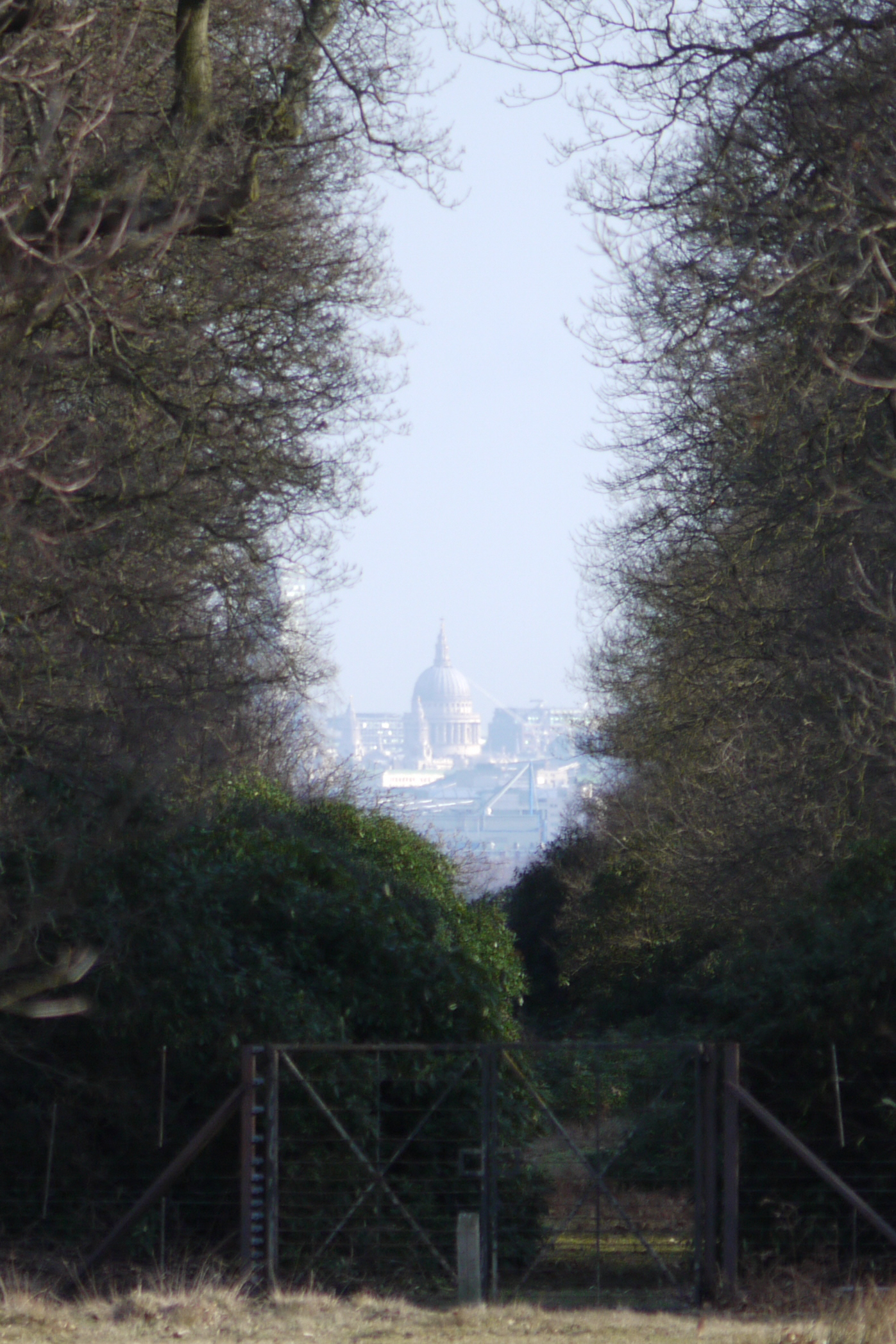
The protected view of St Paul's from King Henry's Mound, before the Manhattan Loft Gardens development was built

There is a protected view of St Paul's Cathedral from King Henry's Mound. From Sawyer's Hill there is a view of central London in which the London Eye, Tower 42 (formerly the NatWest Tower) and 30 St Mary Axe ("The Gherkin") appear to be close to one another.

==== King Henry's Mound ====
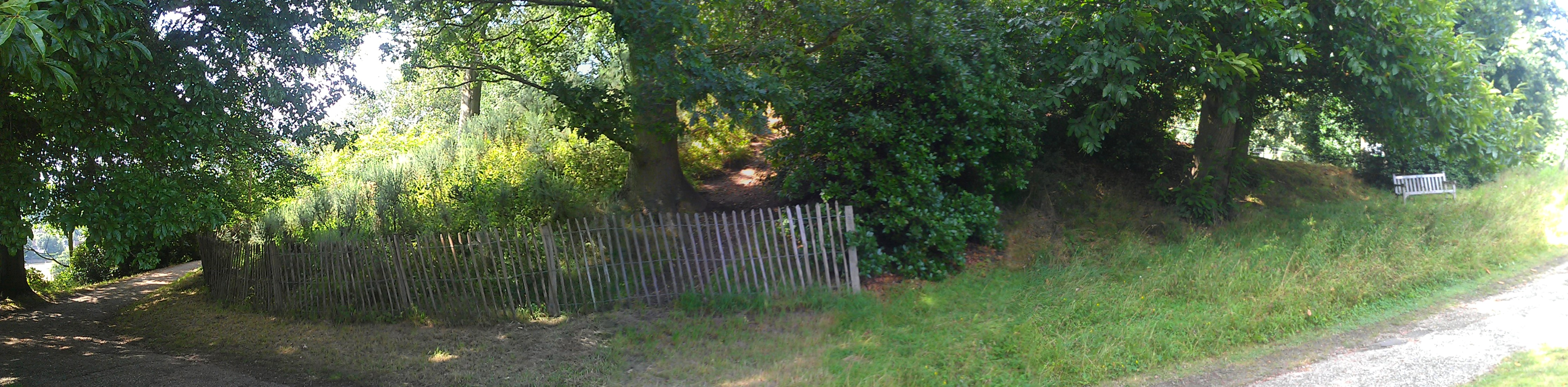
Panorama of King Henry's Mound

King Henry's Mound, which may have been a Neolithic burial barrow, was listed in 2020 by Historic England along with another (unnamed) mound in the park which could be a long barrow. King Henry's Mound is located within the public gardens of Pembroke Lodge. At various times the mound's name has been connected with Henry VIII or his father Henry VII. However, there is no evidence to support the legend that Henry VIII stood on the mound to watch for a sign from St Paul's that Anne Boleyn had been executed at the Tower of London and that he was then free to marry Jane Seymour.

To the west of King Henry's Mound is a panorama of the Thames Valley. St Paul's Cathedral, over 10 miles (16 km) to the east, can be seen through the naked eye or via a telescope that has been installed on the Mound. This vista, created soon after the cathedral was completed in 1710, is protected by a "dome and a half" width of sky on either side. In 2005 the then Mayor of London, Ken Livingstone, sought to overturn this protection and reduce it to "half a dome". In 2009 his successor, Boris Johnson, promised to reinstate the wider view, though approving a development at Victoria Station which, when completed, will obscure its right-hand corner. New gates − "The Way" − which can be viewed through the King Henry's Mound telescope, were installed in 2012 on the edge of Sidmouth Wood to mark the 300th anniversary of St Paul's.

In December 2016, it was reported that Manhattan Loft Gardens, a 42-storey 135m-tall apartment building under construction in Stratford, an area of London not covered by these planning restrictions, had "destroyed" the view from the park as it can now be seen behind the framed view of the cathedral's dome. The developers said that "Despite going through the correct planning processes in a public and transparent manner, at no point was the subject of visual impact to St Paul's ever raised" by the Olympic Delivery Authority or the Greater London Authority and that they were looking into the issues raised by the development. In November 2017, the Friends of Richmond Park reported that their campaigning on the issue had resulted in the Mayor of London, Sadiq Khan, instructing London planners to consult the Greater London Authority on planning requests for high-rise buildings which, if built, could affect the visibility of St Paul's from established viewpoints. His instruction has now been incorporated into planning procedures across Greater London.

=== Plantings and memorials ===
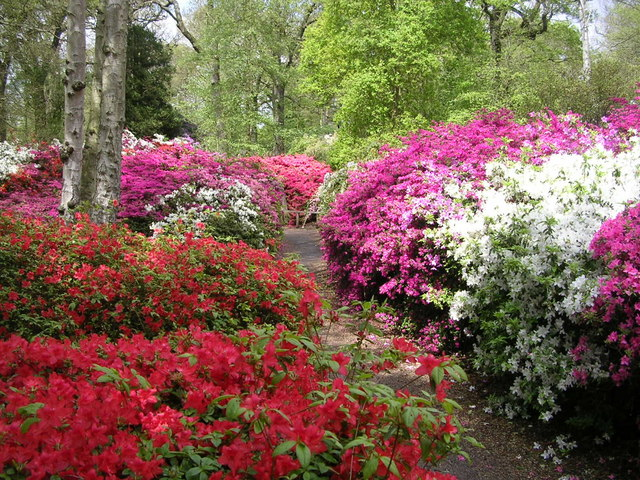
Azaleas flowering in Isabella Plantation in springtime

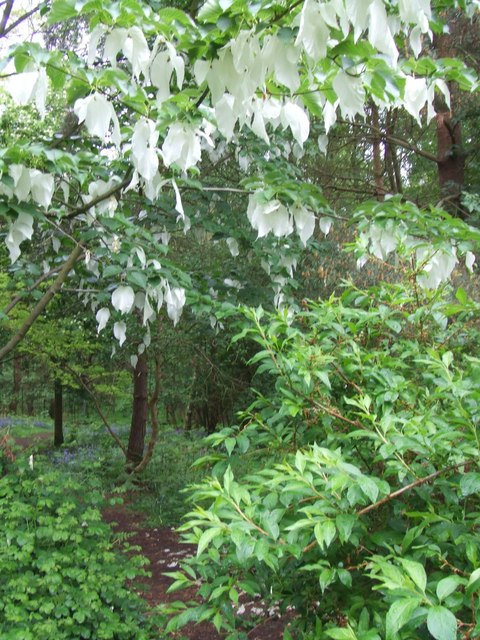
"Handkerchief" tree (Davidia involucrata) in Prince Charles' Spinney

Between 1819 and 1835, Lord Sidmouth, Deputy Ranger, established several new plantations and enclosures, including Sidmouth Wood and the ornamental Isabella Plantation, both fenced to keep deer out. After World War II the existing woodland at Isabella Plantation was transformed into a woodland garden, and is organically run, resulting in a rich flora and fauna. Opened to the public in 1953, it is a major visitor attraction in its own right. It is best known for the flowering, in April and May, of its evergreen azaleas and camellias, planted next to its ponds and streams. There are many rare and unusual trees and shrubs.

The Jubilee Plantation was created in 1887 to commemorate the Golden Jubilee of Queen Victoria. Prince Charles' Spinney was planted out in 1951 with trees protected from the deer by fences, to preserve a natural habitat. The bluebell glade is managed to encourage native British bluebells. Teck Plantation, established in 1905, commemorates the Duke and Duchess of Teck, who lived at White Lodge. Their daughter Mary married George V. Tercentenary Plantation, in 1937, marked the 300th anniversary of the enclosure of the park. Victory Plantation was established in 1946 to mark the end of the Second World War. Queen Mother's Copse, a small triangular enclosure on the woodland hill halfway between Robin Hood Gate and Ham Gate, was established in 1980 to commemorate the 80th birthday of Queen Elizabeth The Queen Mother.

The park lost over 1000 mature trees during the Great Storm of 1987 and the Burns' Day Storm of 1990. The subsequent replanting included a new plantation, Two Storms Wood, near Sheen Gate. Some extremely old trees can be seen inside this enclosure. Bone Copse, named in 2005, was started by the Bone family in 1988 by purchasing and planting a tree from the park authorities in memory of Bessie Bone who died in that year. Trees have been added annually, and when her husband Frederick Bone died in 1994, their children continued the annual planting. The park's Platinum Jubilee Woodland, marking the Platinum Jubilee of Queen Elizabeth II, was opened by David Attenborough in 2023.

==== James Thomson and Poet's Corner ====
Poet's Corner, at the north end of Pembroke Lodge Gardens, commemorates the poet James Thomson (1700–1748), who was living in Richmond at the time of his death. A curved metal bench inscribed with lines by Thomson and known as Poet's Seat is located there. Sculpted by Richard Farrington, it was based on an idea by Jane Fowles. Benches, also sculpted by Farrington, at King Henry's Mound are inscribed with a few lines from Thomson's poem The Seasons. A wooden memorial plaque with an ode to Thomson by the writer and historian John Heneage Jesse was installed near Pembroke Lodge stables in 1851. The plaque was replaced by the Selborne Society in 1895. In 2014 Poet's Corner was moved to the other side of the main path, and the ode, on a re-gilded board, was installed in a new oak frame. The new Poet's Corner, funded by the Friends of Richmond Park and the Visitor Centre at Pembroke Lodge, and by a donation in memory of Wendy Vachell, includes three curved reclaimed teak benches. The benches are inscribed with a couplet by the Welsh poet W. H. Davies, "A poor life this, if, full of care, we have no time to stand and stare". Poet's Corner is linked to King Henry's Mound by the John Beer Laburnum Arch, named after one of Pembroke Lodge Gardens' former charge-hands. The arch has a display of yellow laburnum flowers in May.

==== Ian Dury musical bench ====
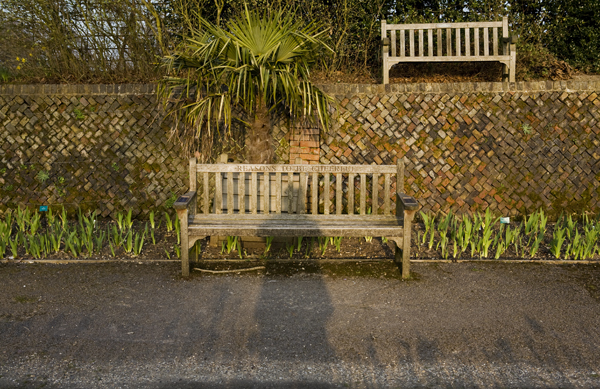
Ian Dury memorial bench

In 2002 a "musical bench", designed by Mil Stricevic, was placed in a favoured viewing spot of rock singer and lyricist Ian Dury (1942–2000) near Poet's Corner. On the back of the bench are the words "Reasons to be cheerful", the title of one of Dury's songs. The solar-powered seat was intended to allow visitors to plug in and listen to eight of his songs and an interview, but was repeatedly vandalised. In 2015 the bench was refurbished and the MP3 players and solar panels were replaced with metal plates on which a QR code can be scanned via visitors' smartphones. Visitors can access nine Ian Dury and the Blockheads songs and hear Dury's Desert Island Discs interview with Sue Lawley, first broadcast on BBC Radio 4 on 15 December 1996.

== Nature ==
=== Wildlife ===
Originally created for deer hunting, Richmond Park now has 630 red and fallow deer that roam freely across much of the park. A cull takes place each November and February to ensure numbers can be sustained; about 200 deer are culled annually and the meat is sold to licensed game dealers.

The park is an important refuge for wildlife, including woodpeckers, squirrels, rabbits, snakes, frogs, toads, stag beetles and many other insects, plus numerous ancient trees and varieties of fungi. It is notable for its rare beetles. It supports a large population of rose-ringed parakeets.

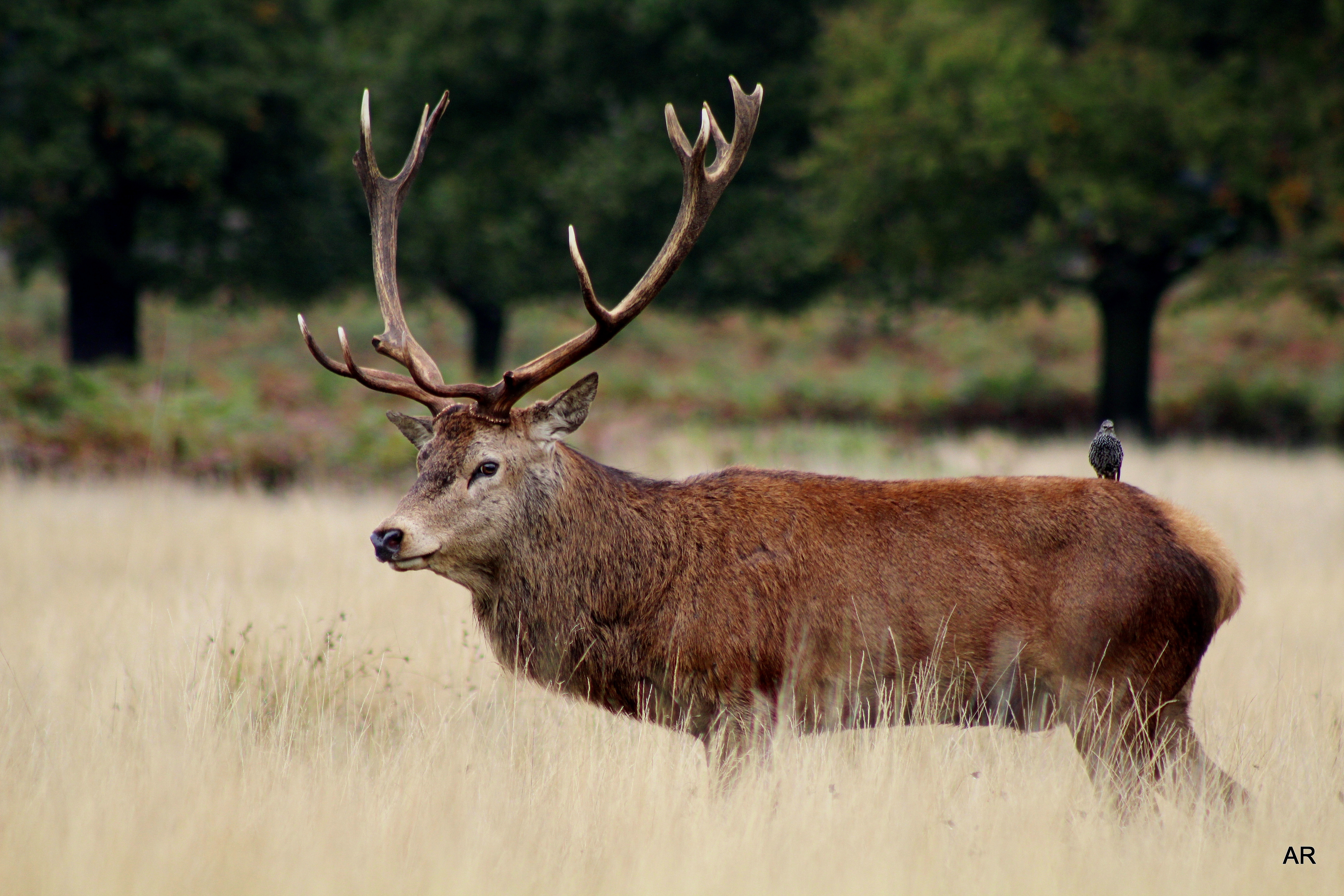
Red deer stag and starling

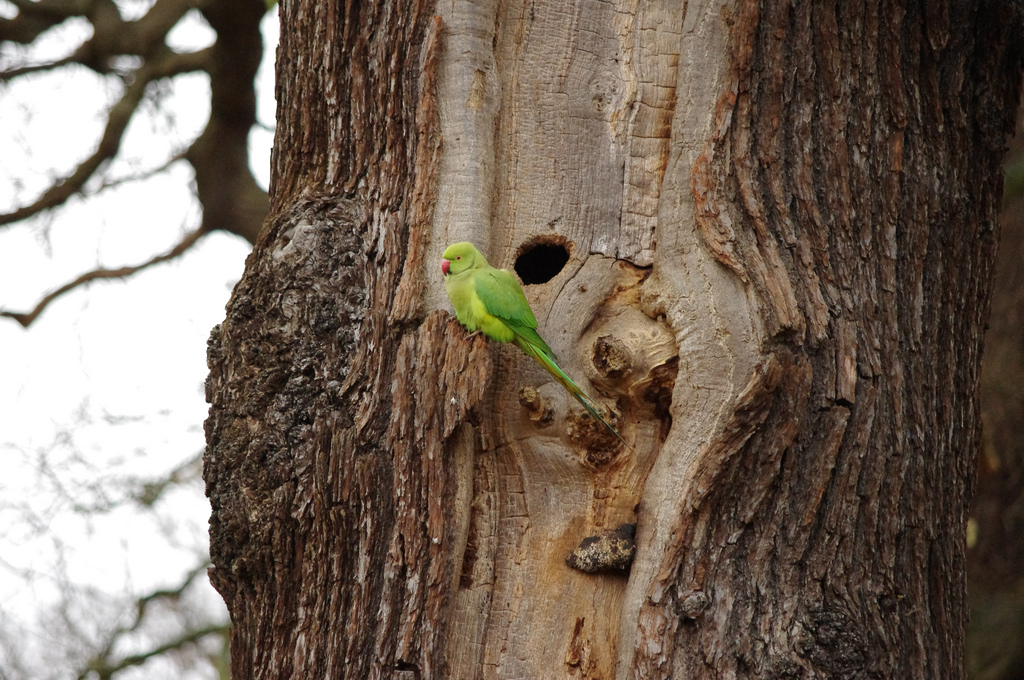
A female ring-necked parakeet

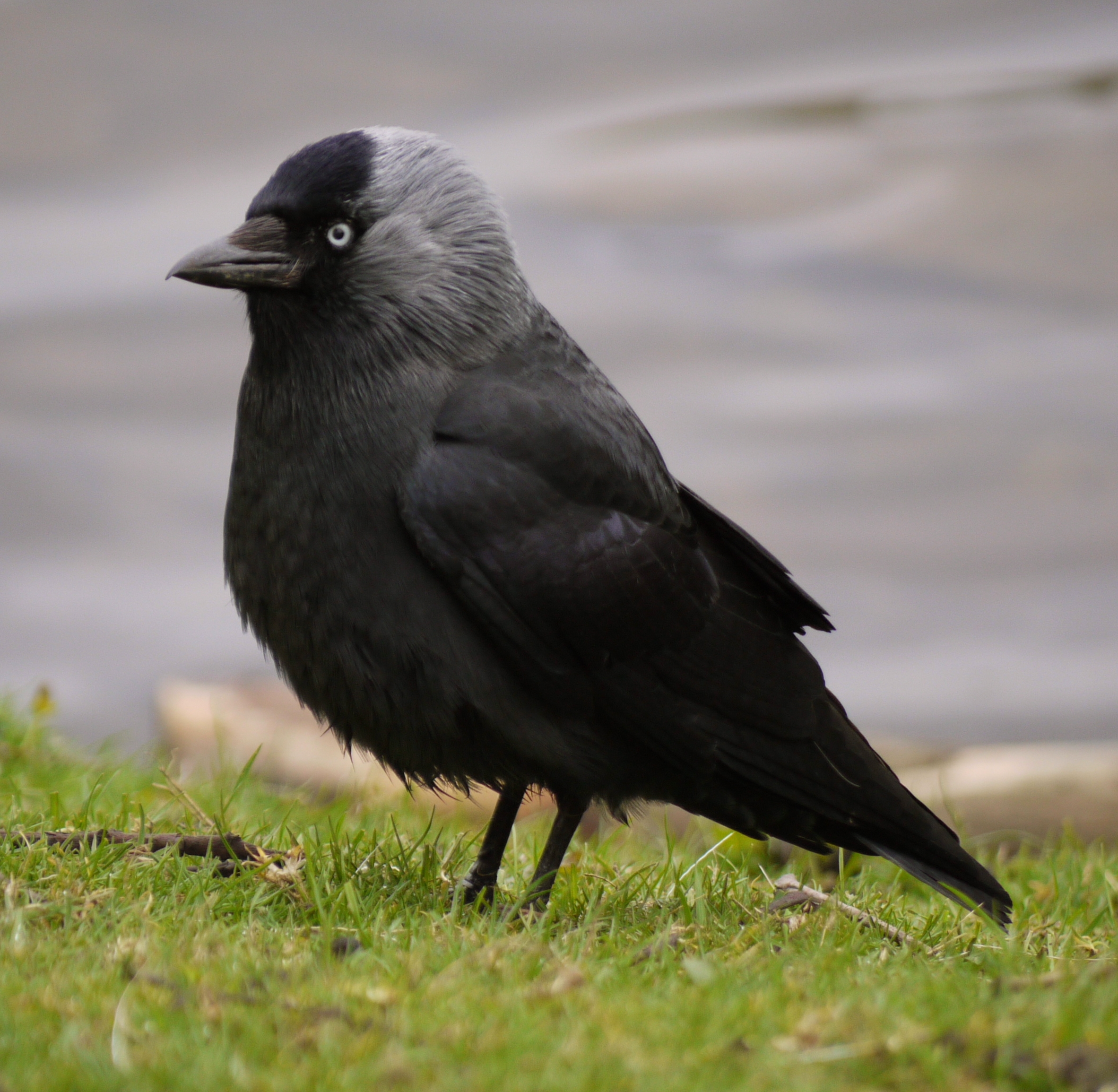
Jackdaw

=== Ponds and streams ===
There are about 30 ponds in the park. Some – including Barn Wood Pond, Bishop's Pond, Gallows Pond, Leg of Mutton Pond, Martin's Pond and White Ash Pond – have been created to drain the land or to provide water for livestock.

The Pen Ponds (which in the past were used to rear carp for food) date from 1746. They were formed when a trench was dug in the early 17th century to drain a boggy area; later in that century this was widened and deepened by the extraction of gravel for local building. The Ponds now take in water from streams flowing from the higher ground around them and release it to Beverley Brook. Beverley Brook and the two Pen Ponds are the most visible areas of water in the park.

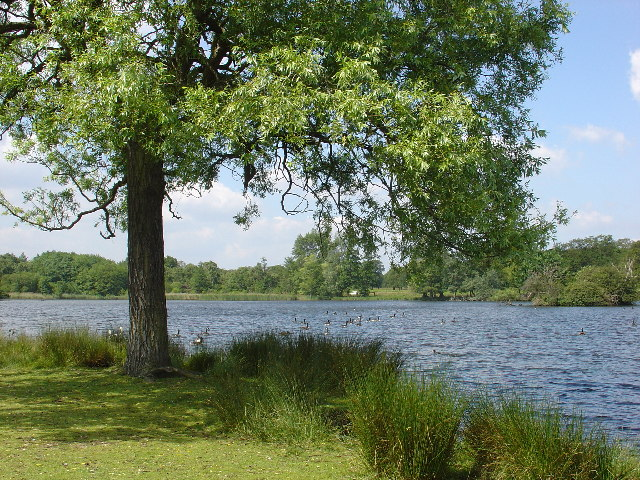
The southern and upper of the two Pen Ponds

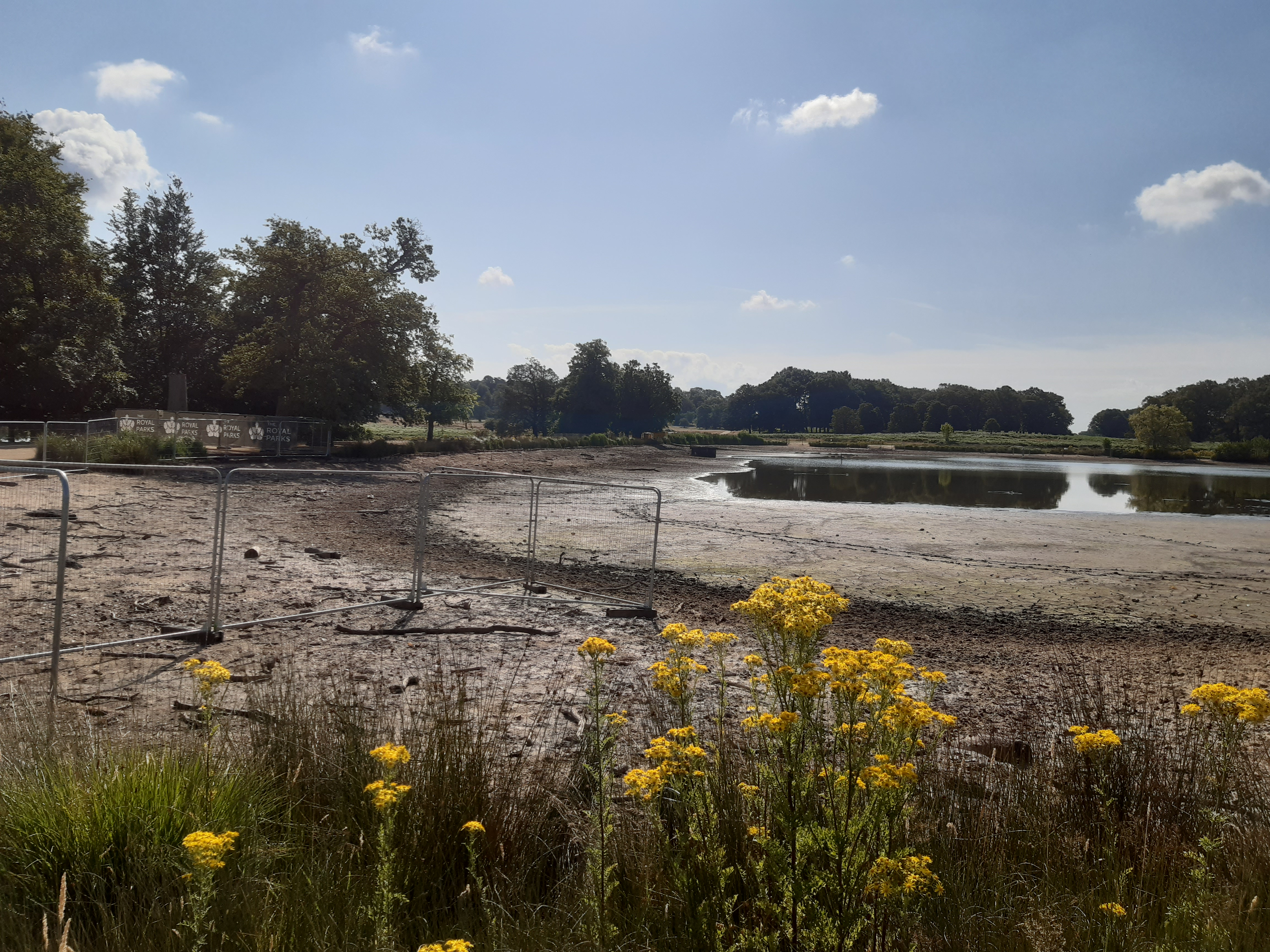
The upper Pen Pond drained to protect its dam during work on its outflow

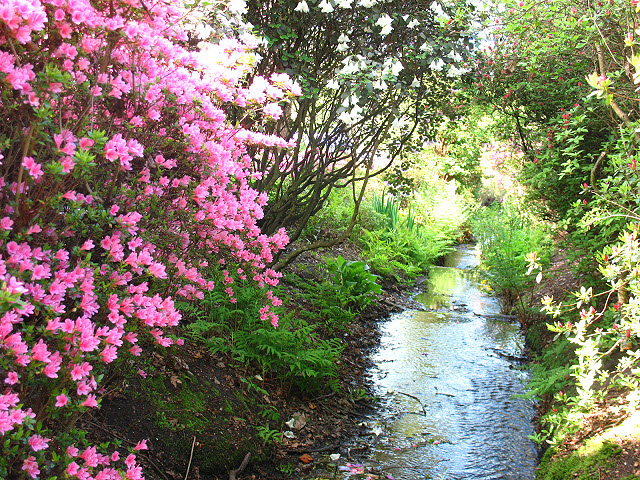
A stream flowing through the Isabella Plantation

Beverley Brook rises at Cuddington Recreation Ground in Worcester Park and enters the park (where it is followed by the Tamsin Trail and Beverley Walk) at Robin Hood Gate, creating a water feature used by deer, smaller animals and water grasses and some water lilies. Its name is derived from the presence, before the 16th century, of the European beaver.

Most of the streams in the park drain into Beverley Brook but a spring above Dann's Pond flows to join Sudbrook (from "South brook") on the park boundary. Sudbrook flows through a small valley known as Ham Dip and has been dammed and enlarged in two places to form Ham Dip Pond and Ham Gate Pond, first mapped in 1861 and 1754 respectively. These were created for the watering of deer. Both ponds underwent restoration work including de-silting, which was completed in 2013. Sudbrook drains the western escarpment of the hill that, to the east, forms part of the catchment of Beverley Brook and, to the south, the Hogsmill River. Sudbrook is joined by the Latchmere stream just beyond Ham Gate Pond. Sudbrook then flows into Sudbrook Park, Petersham. Another stream rises north of Sidmouth Wood and goes through Conduit Wood towards the park boundary near Bog Gate. A separate water system for Isabella Plantation was developed in the 1950s. Water from the upper Pen Pond is pumped to Still Pond, Thomson's Pond and Peg's Pond.

The park's newest pond is Attenborough Pond, opened by and named after the broadcaster and naturalist Sir David Attenborough in July 2014. It was created as part of the park's Ponds and Streams Conservation Programme.

== In culture ==
=== The Hearsum Collection ===
The Hearsum Collection is a registered charity (Note: The Hearsum Collection's charity registration number is 1153010.) that collects and preserves the heritage of Richmond Park. It has a collection, started by Daniel Hearsum (1958–2021) in 1997, of heritage material covering the last four centuries, with over 5000 items including antique prints, paintings, maps, postcards, photographs, documents, books and press cuttings. Volunteers from the Friends of Richmond Park have been cataloguing them. The Collection, which as of 2026 continues to be stored in unsatisfactory accommodation in Pembroke Lodge, is overseen by volunteers and part-time staff. The trustees announced in 2014 plans for a new purpose-built heritage centre to provide full public access to the Collection.

In April 2017 the Collection helped to mount an exhibition at Dublin's Phoenix Park entitled Parks, Our Shared Heritage: The Phoenix Park, Dublin & The Royal Parks, London, demonstrating the historical links between the parks. The exhibition was also displayed at London's Mall Galleries in July and August 2017.

=== Literature ===
George MacDonald's novel The Marquis of Lossie (published in London in 1877 by Hurst and Blackett) has a chapter entitled "Richmond Park". In Georgette Heyer's Regency romance Sylvester, or the Wicked Uncle (1957) there is an expedition to Richmond Park. Isabella Plantation is the scene of a picnic and a child's disappearance in Chris Cleave's 2008 novel The Other Hand. The park features in Jacqueline Wilson's novel Lily Alone (2010). The novelist Shena Mackay was commissioned by The Royal Parks to write a short story about Richmond Park named The Running of the Deer which was published in 2009. Anthony Horowitz's 2014 novel Moriarty, about Arthur Conan Doyle's character in his Sherlock Holmes stories, includes a scene set in Richmond Park.

The park features in Green Glass Beads (2011), the poetry anthology edited by Jacqueline Wilson. Joseph Coelho's 2017 poetry anthology Overheard in a Tower Block includes a poem for children, "Richmond Park".

A Hind in Richmond Park by William Henry Hudson, published in 1922 and republished in 2006, is an extended natural history essay. It includes an account of his visits to the park and a particular occasion when a young girl was struck by a red deer when she tried to feed it an acorn.

=== Art ===
==== 17th to 19th centuries ====
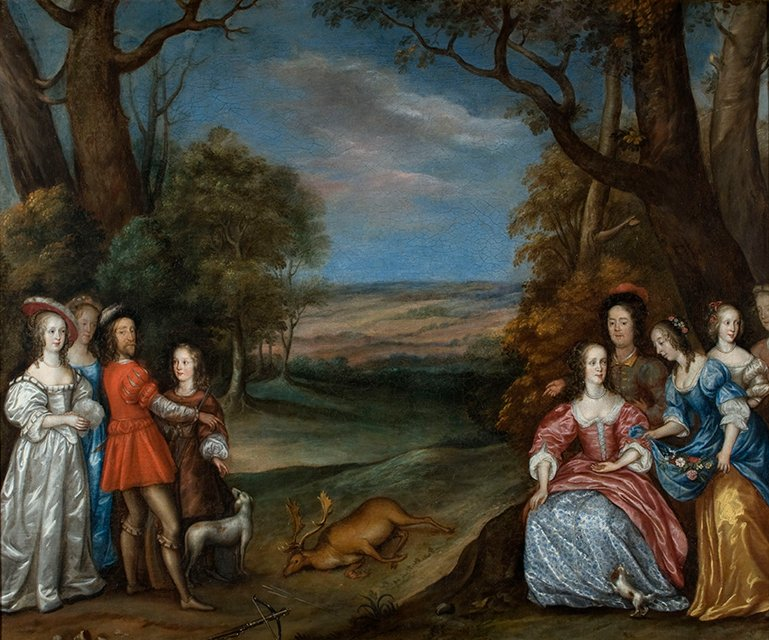
The Carlile Family with Sir Justinian Isham in Richmond Park by Joan Carlile

Lamport Hall in Lamport, Northamptonshire holds an oil painting, The Carlile Family with Sir Justinian Isham in Richmond Park. The painting is by Joan Carlile (1600–1679). She and her husband Lodowick, who was the park's keeper/deputy ranger during the Commonwealth period, had accommodation at Petersham Lodge, where they lived from 1637 to 1663. (Note: Petersham Lodge, now referred to by historians as "Old Petersham Lodge", was demolished in the 1690s by Lawrence Hyde, Earl of Rochester.)

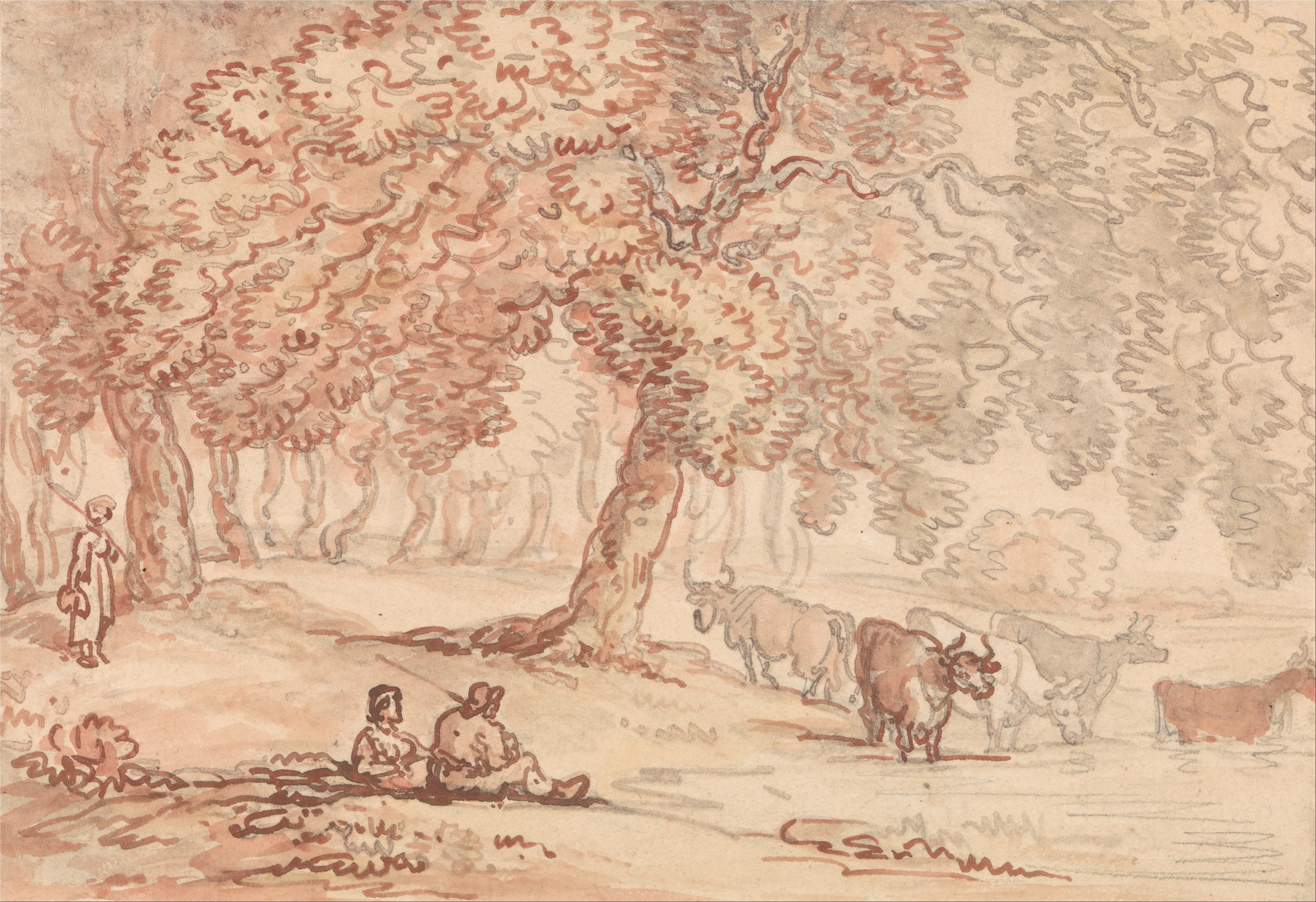
Richmond Park by Thomas Rowlandson

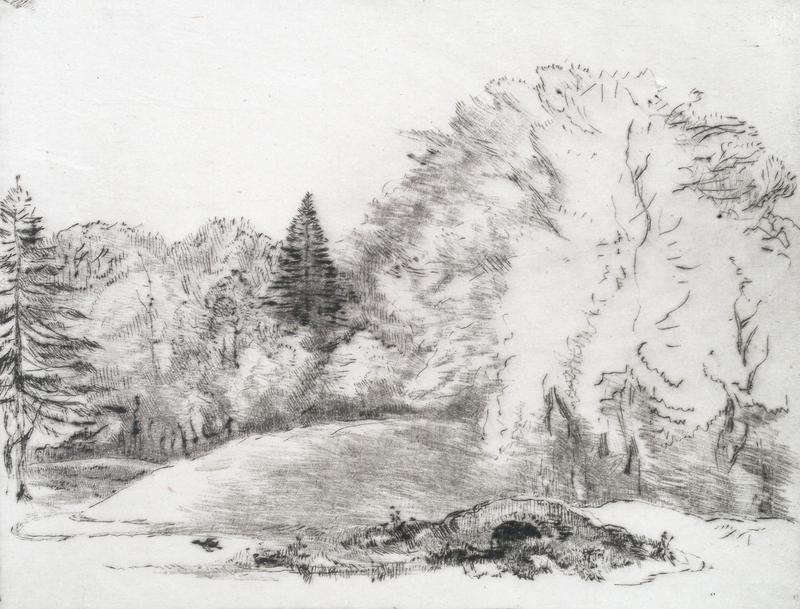
View in Richmond Park, A Small Bridge to the Right by Andrew Geddes

A portrait by T Stewart (a pupil of Sir Joshua Reynolds) in 1758 of John Lewis, Brewer of Richmond, Surrey, whose legal action forced Princess Amelia to reinstate pedestrian access to the park, is in the Richmond upon Thames Borough Art Collection. It is on display in Richmond Reference Library.

Joseph Allen's Sir Robert Walpole (1676–1745), 1st Earl of Orford, KG, as Ranger of Richmond Park (after Jonathan Richardson the Elder) is in the collection of the National Trust, and is held at Erddig, Wrexham. The painting is based on a portrait with a similar title, by Jonathan Richardson the Elder and John Wootton, which is held at Norwich Castle Museum and Art Gallery.

Artist and caricaturist Thomas Rowlandson (1757–1827)'s undated drawing Richmond Park and James Smetham's Lovers in Richmond Park, painted in 1864, are held at the Yale Center for British Art in New Haven, Connecticut. The Earl of Dysart's Family in Richmond Park by William Frederick Witherington (1785–1865) is in The Hearsum Collection at Pembroke Lodge.

Landscape: View in Richmond Park was painted in 1850 by the English Romanticist painter John Martin (1789–1854). It is held at the Fitzwilliam Museum in Cambridge. In Richmond Park, a watercolour painted in 1852 by William Bennett (1811–1871), is held by Tate Britain. It can be viewed, by appointment, at its Prints and Drawings Rooms.

The oil painting In Richmond Park (1856) by the Victorian painter Henry Moore (1831–1895) is in the collection of the York Museums Trust. Landscape with Deer, Richmond Park (1875) by Alfred Dawson is in the Reading Museum's collection. John Buxton Knight's White Lodge, Richmond Park, painted in 1898, is in the collection of Leeds Museums and Galleries. Andrew Geddes' View of Richmond Park, a Fountain on the Left (pre-1844), and View in Richmond Park, A Small Bridge to the Right (c.1826), are in the collection of Aberdeen Archives, Gallery and Museums.

==== 20th and 21st centuries ====
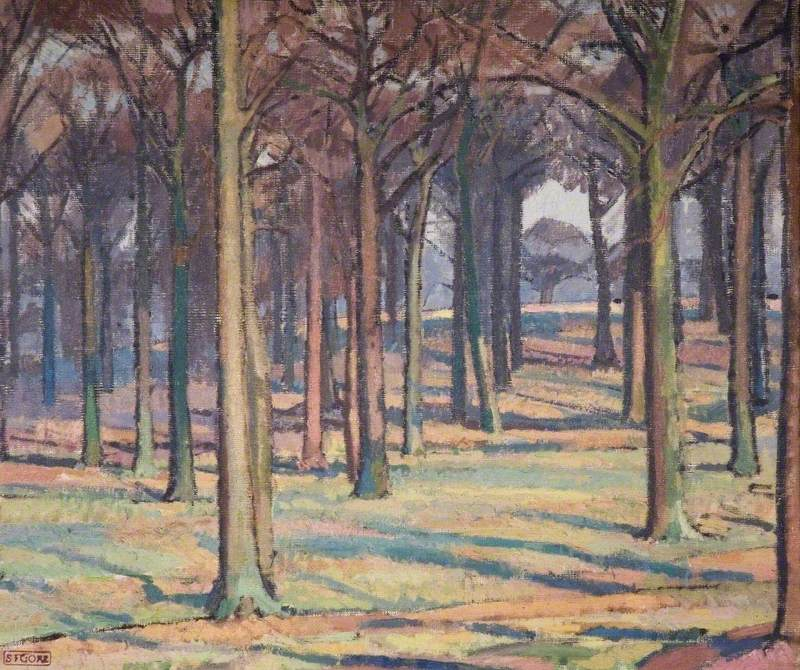
Spencer Gore's painting Wood in Richmond Park is held at the Birmingham Art Gallery.

Spencer Gore's painting Richmond Park, thought to have been painted in the autumn of 1913 or shortly before the artist's death in March 1914, was exhibited at the Paterson and Carfax Gallery in 1920. In 1939 it was exhibited in Warsaw, Helsinki and Stockholm by the British Council as Group of Trees. It is now in the Tate's collection under its original title but is not currently on display. The painting is one of a series of landscapes painted in Richmond Park during the last months of Gore's life. According to Tate curator Helena Bonett, Gore's early death from pneumonia, two months before what would have been his 36th birthday, was brought on by his painting outdoors in Richmond Park in the cold and wet winter months. It is not certain where in the park the picture was made but a row of trees close to the pond near Cambrian Gate has a very close resemblance to those in the painting. Another Gore painting, with the same title (Richmond Park), painted in 1914, is at the Ashmolean Museum in Oxford. His painting Wood in Richmond Park is in the Birmingham Art Gallery's collection.

Chinese artist Chiang Yee (1903–1977) wrote and illustrated several books while living in Britain. Deer in Richmond Park is Plate V in his book The Silent Traveller in London, published in 1938.

Kenneth Armitage (1916–2002) made a series of sculptures and drawings of oak trees in Richmond Park between 1975 and 1986. His collage and etching Richmond Park: Tall Figure with Jerky Arms (1981) is in the British Government Art Collection and is on display at the British Embassy in Prague. The Government Art Collection also holds Armitage's Richmond Park: Two Trees with White Trunks (1975), and Richmond Park: Five Trees, Grey Sky (1979). His bronze sculpture Richmond Oak (1985–86) is displayed at the British Embassy in Brasilia, Brazil.

The oil painting Richmond Park (1913) by Arthur George Bell is in the collection of the London Transport Museum. The oil painting Autumn, Richmond Park by Alfred James Munnings is at the Sir Alfred Munnings Art Museum in Colchester. Trees, Richmond Park, Surrey, painted in 1938 by Francis Ferdinand Maurice Cook, is in the Manchester Art Gallery's collection. Richmond Park No 2 by the English Impressionist painter Laura Knight is at the Royal Academy of Arts. In Richmond Park (1962) by James Andrew Wykeham Simons is at the UCL Art Museum at University College London. Queen Mary's Hospital, Roehampton holds Richmond Park Morning, London (2004) by Bob Rankin and Richmond Park, London (2005–06), a panel of five oil paintings by Yvonne Fletcher.

==== Historic posters ====
The Underground Electric Railways Company published, in 1911, a poster, Richmond Park, designed by Charles Sharland. This is at the London Transport Museum, which also has: a District line poster from 1908, Richmond Park for pleasure and fresh air, by an unknown artist; Richmond Park, by an unknown artist (1910); Richmond by Underground by Alfred France (1910); Richmond Park by Arthur G Bell (1913); Richmond Park; humours no. 10 by German American puppeteer and illustrator Tony Sarg (1913); Richmond Park by tram by Charles Sharland (1913); Richmond Park by Harold L Oakley (1914); Natural history of London; no. 3, herons at Richmond Park by Edwin Noble (1916); Richmond Park by Emilio Camilio Leopoldo Tafani (1920); Rambles in Richmond Park by Freda Lingstrom (1924); the original artwork for Richmond Park by Charles Paine (1925); and Richmond Park, a poster commissioned by London Transport in 1938 and illustrated by the artist Dame Laura Knight.

=== Film ===
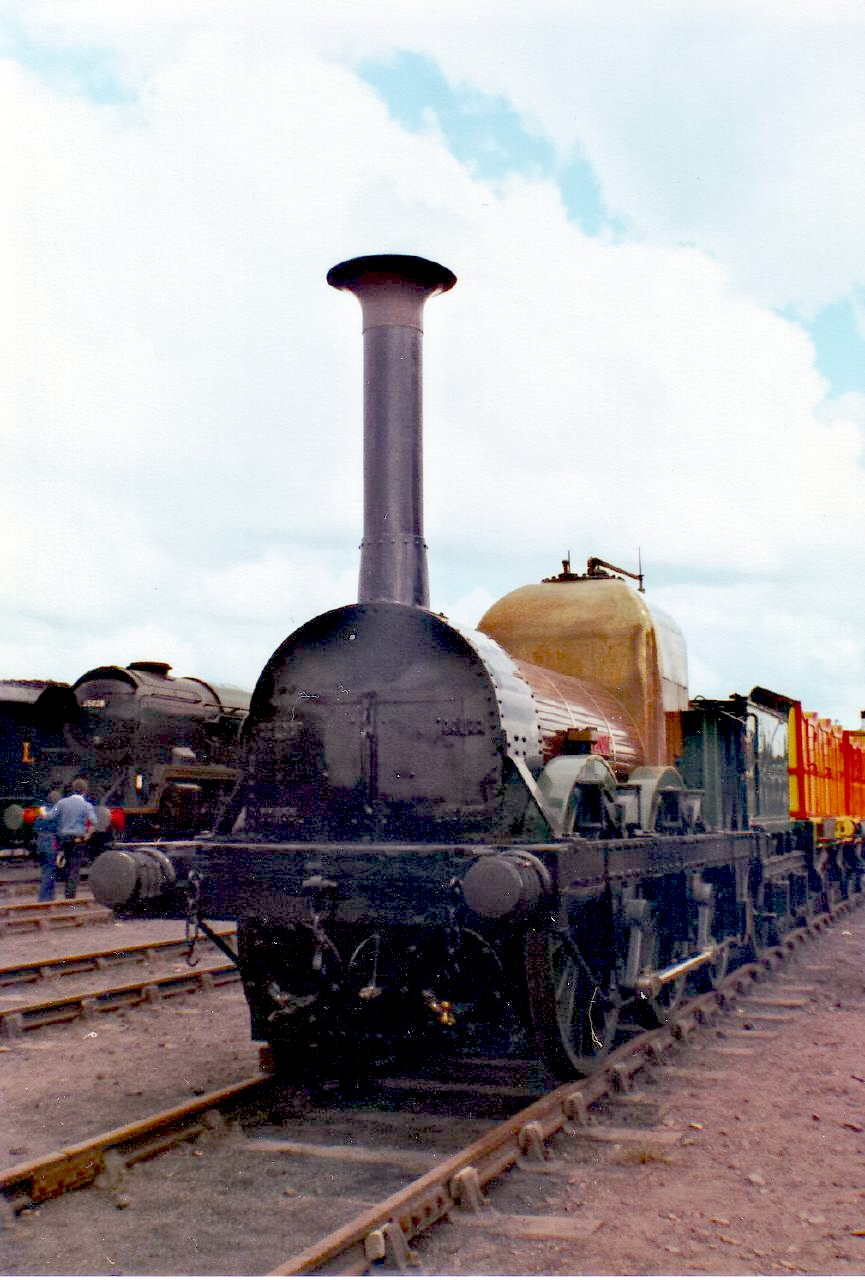
Lion (seen here in May 1980) masqueraded as Thunderbolt for the film The Titfield Thunderbolt.

Richmond Park has been a location for several films and TV series and is regularly featured in television programmes, corporate videos and fashion shoots. It has made an appearance on Blue Peter, Inside Out (the BBC regional current affairs programme) and Springwatch (the BBC natural history series). In 2014 it was featured in a video commissioned by The Hearsum Collection. It was the subject of a nature documentary, Richmond Park – National Nature Reserve, presented by David Attenborough and produced by the Friends of Richmond Park, which won the best "Longform" film in the 2018 national Charity Film Awards.

A locomotive runs through the park and crashes into a tree in the Ealing Studios comedy film The Titfield Thunderbolt (1953). In the 1968 film Performance, James Fox crosses Richmond Park in a Rolls-Royce car. The park was the backdrop for the classic historical film Anne of the Thousand Days (1969), with Richard Burton and Geneviève Bujold, which looks back to what is now Richmond in the 16th century. The film tells the story of King Henry VIII's courtship of Anne Boleyn and their brief marriage. An Indian dust storm was filmed in the park for the film Heat and Dust (1983). The Royal Ballet School in Richmond Park featured in the film Billy Elliot (2000).

In 2010, director Guy Ritchie filmed parts of Sherlock Holmes: A Game of Shadows (2011) in the park with Robert Downey Jr. and Jude Law. Some of the scenes from Into the Woods (2014), the Disney fantasy film featuring Meryl Streep, were filmed in the park. Richmond Park was the setting for some scenes in the 2018 family comedy film Patrick.

=== International connections ===
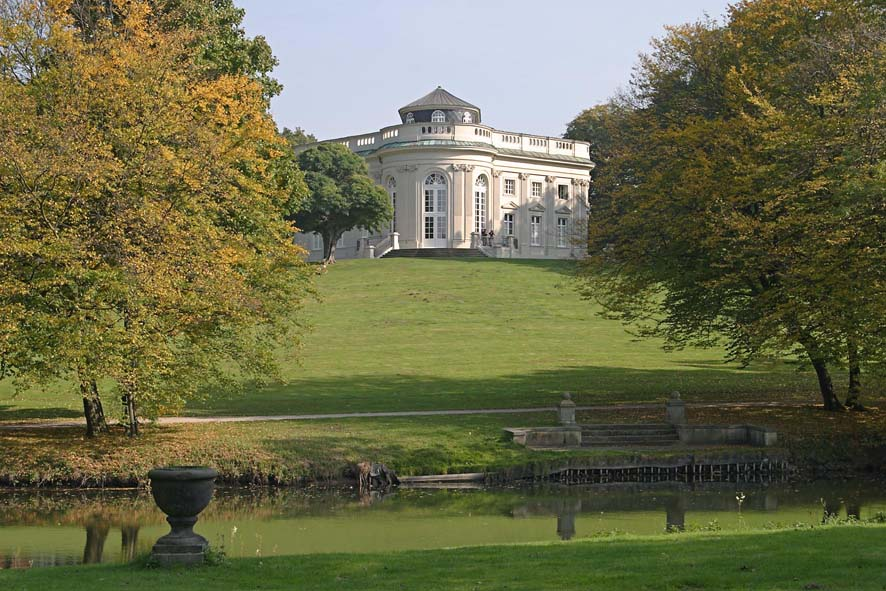
Park at Richmond Castle, Brunswick

Richmond Park gave its name to Schloss Richmond und Parkanlage in Brunswick, Germany, which was created in 1768 for Princess Augusta, sister of George III. She was married to Charles William Ferdinand, Duke of Brunswick and was feeling homesick, so an English-style park was designed by Lancelot "Capability" Brown and a palace built for her, both with the name "Richmond".

== See also ==
- East Sheen Common
- Pesthouse Common, Richmond
- Richmond Cemetery
- Sudbrook Park, Petersham
- List of national nature reserves in England
- List of Sites of Special Scientific Interest in Greater London
- Parks, open spaces and nature reserves in the London Borough of Richmond upon Thames

== Sources ==
- Baxter Brown, Michael (1985). Richmond Park: The History of a Royal Deer Park. London: Robert Hale. ISBN 978-0-7090-2163-6. LCCN 85177278. OL 2613329M.
- Cloake, John (1996). The Palaces and Parks of Richmond and Kew II: Richmond Lodge and the Kew Palaces. Phillimore & Co Ltd. ISBN 978-1-86077-023-4. OCLC 36045530. OL 8627654M.
- Fowler, Simon (2026). "10: Richmond Park". Richmond at War 1939–1945 (second ed.). Richmond Local History Society. pp. 79–89. ISBN 978-1-912314-06-5.
- McDowall, David (1996). Richmond Park: The Walker's Historical Guide. David McDowall. ISBN 978-0-9527847-0-8. OCLC 36123245. OL 8477606M.
- Pollard, Mary; Crompton, Ron (2011). The First 50 Years: A History of the Friends of Richmond Park (PDF). Friends of Richmond Park.
- Rabbitts, Paul A. (2014). Richmond Park: From Medieval Pasture to Royal Park. Stroud: Amberley Publishing. ISBN 978-1-4456-1856-2.
