= Richmond Park Golf Course =

Golf course in London, England

- Richmond Park
- 51°27′7″N 0°15′17″W

Club information
- Location: East Sheen
- Established: 1923
- Type: public
- Owner: The Royal Parks
- Operator: Glendale Golf since 2004
- Tota holes: 36

Prince's course
- Designed by: Fred Hawtree
- Par: 68
- Length: 5,487 yards (5,017 m)
- Course rating: 66.9 (white tees)
- Slope rating: 119 (white tees)

Duke's course
- Designed by: Fred Hawtree
- Par: 71
- Length: 6,359 yards (5,815 m)
- Course rating: 71.1 (white tees)
- Slope rating: 131 (white tees)

Richmond Park Golf Course, a public, daily fee golf course comprising two 18-hole courses, is located in Richmond Park in the London Borough of Richmond upon Thames and is home to Richmond Park Golf Club, Putney Park Golf Club and White Lodge Golf Club.

== History ==
During and following the First World War there was a growth of provision of sports facilities within Richmond Park granted by the British monarchy. In order to provide golf facilities to "local artisans", unable to afford membership of private clubs, George V commissioned J. H. Taylor, one of the famous "Great Triumvirate" of Braid, Taylor and Vardon, to lay out an 18-hole golf course with architect Fred Hawtree on the eastern side of Richmond Park in the early 1920s.

The golf course was opened in 1923 by Edward, Prince of Wales (who was to become King Edward VIII and, after his abdication, Duke of Windsor). This became known as the "Prince's course". In 1925, following the course's success, a second 18-hole course was added, again designed by Hawtree and inaugurated this time by the Duke of York (later George VI), giving the course its title of the "Duke's course".

Following opening, a brass tablet was unveiled stating: "Richmond Park Golf Courses 1923-1926. This tablet commemorates the generous and public spirited action of the under-mentioned gentlemen who undertook responsibility for the construction and management of these golf courses up to the date of their transfer to His Majesty's Office of Works. The Rt. Hon The Lord Riddell, Chairman of the Committee; Sir Sydney M. Skinner KT; Sir James H. Dunn BT; Sir Howard Frank BT G.B.E K.C.B; Sir Joseph Hood BT; Sir Alexander Grant BT; George W. Beldam; Leonard H. Bentall; J.H. Taylor, Technical Adviser."

In 1985, Martin Hawtree, grandson of the original architect, was commissioned to undertake a programme of modernisation on the two courses.

== Courses ==
The course lies on the boundary of the park to the east of Beverley Brook, between Roehampton and Robin Hood gates, and is in the London Borough of Richmond upon Thames, bordering on the London Borough of Wandsworth. The Alton Estate, Roehampton dominates the western skyline.

The course was developed on the former "Great Paddock" of Richmond Park, an area used for feeding deer for the royal hunt. The tree belt in this part of the park was supplemented by additional planting in 1936.

Richmond Park, excluding the golf course, is a Site of Special Scientific Interest and national nature reserve and has a policy of encouraging biodiversity. One aspect of this is that decaying wood, whether still on the tree or fallen to the ground, is left undisturbed as far as possible to provide natural habitats. One of the local golf course rules is therefore that fallen trees and dead wood must be treated as Immovable Obstructions during the game.

Originally, access to the golf course was from Richmond Park itself at the rear of Roehampton Gate car park. Both the Prince's course and the Duke's course were remodelled in 2013 to start at the location of the new clubhouse, giving easier access to the courses from the A3 road. For example, the original opening hole on the Duke's course is now the 10th hole on the Prince's course. The new clubhouse and course layout was officially opened in August 2013, adding seven new greens, eight new tees, a new driving range, and new, accessible golf academy.

The Prince's course lies on the higher ground and is 18-hole, 5,487 yards (5,017 m), par 68, with the 477 yards (436 m), par 5, 9th hole being the longest.

The Duke's course is 18-hole, 6,359 yards (5,815 m), par 71 with the 12th, par 5, 522 yards (477 m), being the longest. It is the lower and flatter of the two courses, crossed by a stream on holes 3, 4, 5, 6, 12, 13 and 14. The Duke's course is generally seen as the more challenging course.

== Other facilities ==
The course also has a 20-bay driving range and a limited range pro shop selling some golf clothing, balls and tees etc. but no clubs. You are also able to rent clubs and buggies. A new grass-roof clubhouse opened for business in April 2013, located near Chohole Gate at the south of the course. The new clubhouse has very low light and noise emission and the courses incorporate new ponds and other environmental features.

== Golf clubs ==
The Priory Golf Club was formed in 1924 by a group of enthusiastic players based at the newly opened "Prince's course". The club changed its name to the current Richmond Park Golf Club in 1953. The club continues to play regularly at the course. "The aim of the club is to bring all our members together in competitive golf and social functions in as pleasant and friendly an atmosphere as possible. Membership opportunities are always available to like-minded individuals".

Putney Park Golf Club was formed in 1925 and continues to play regularly at the course. White Lodge Golf Club was formed in 1928 and continues to play regularly at the course.

== See also ==
- Roehampton Club
- Richmond Golf Club
