= Isabella Plantation =

English woodland garden

Coordinates: 51.433°N 0.277°W

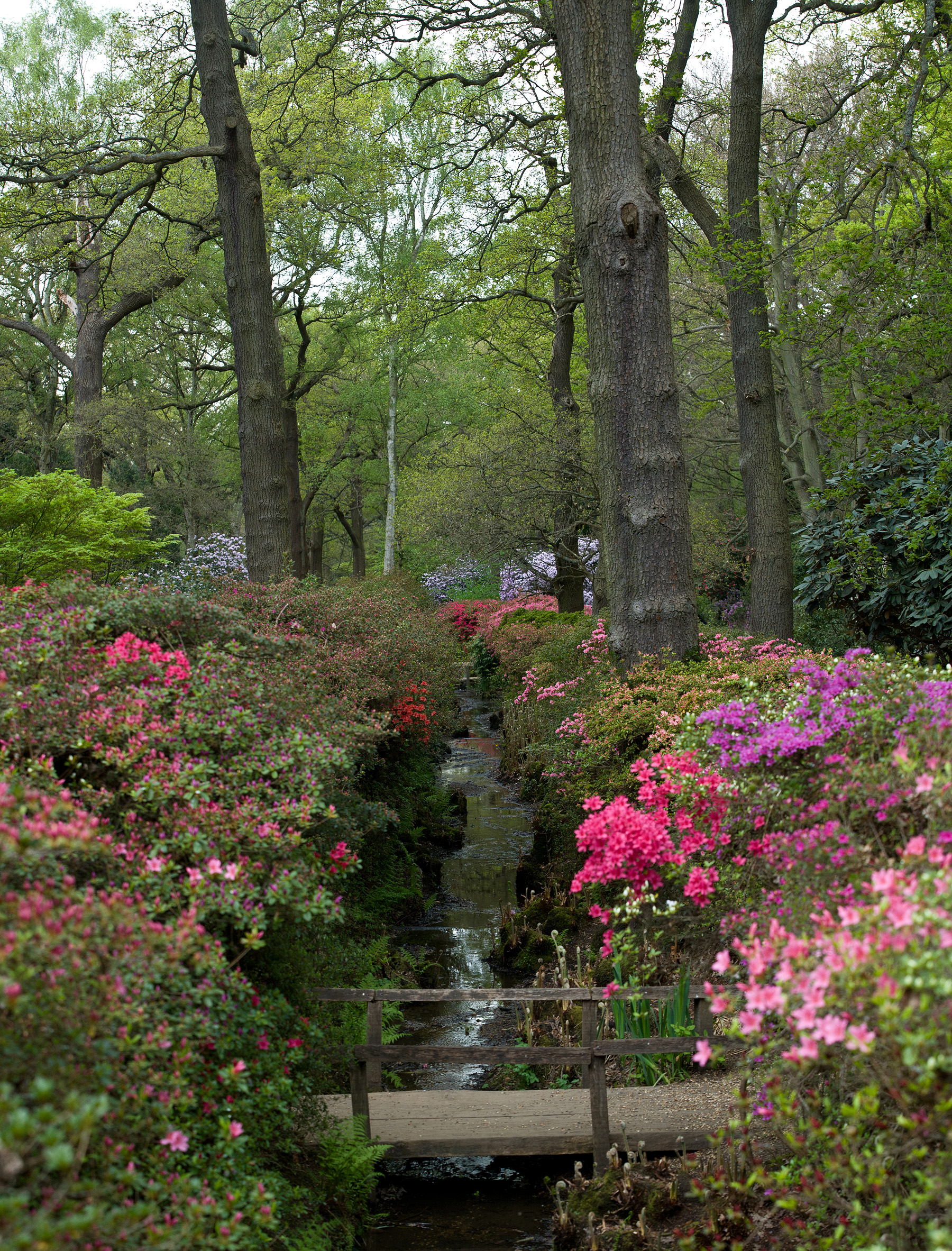
Isabella Plantation, Richmond Park, London.

Isabella Plantation is a woodland garden in Richmond Park in south west London. It is managed by The Royal Parks.

Originally located in a boggy part of Richmond Park, it was labelled on a 1771 map as Isabell Slade. Slade, or sleyt, meant a bog or open space between woods and or banks, and isabel meant dirty or greyish brown, referring to the colour of the soil there.

The Isabella Plantation was established in the early 19th century when Lord Sidmouth, who was Deputy Ranger of Richmond Park and a former Prime Minister of the United Kingdom, fenced it as an area of woodland to keep the park's deer out. After World War II it was transformed into a woodland garden. It is now organically run, resulting in a rich flora and fauna. Opened to the public in 1953, it is now a major visitor attraction in its own right.

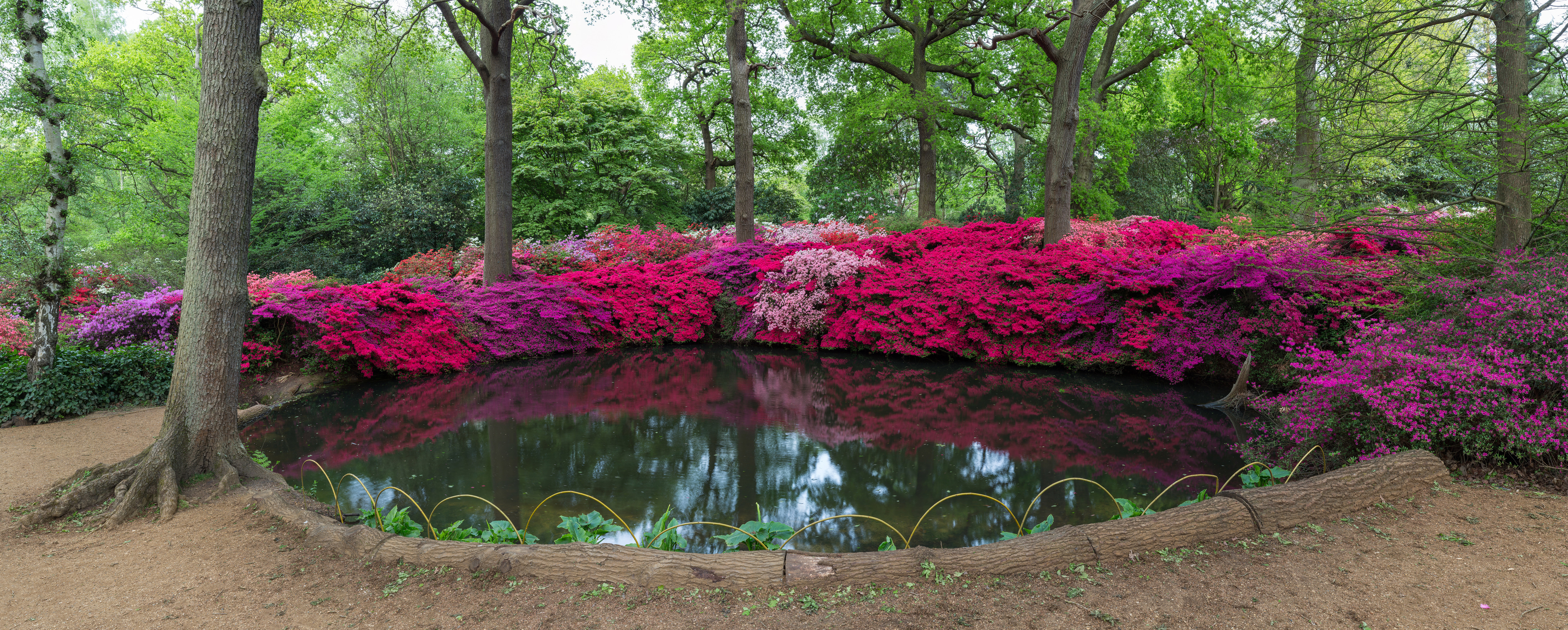
Isabella Plantation in bloom in May

In October 2012 it was reported that about 40 per cent of the Isabella Plantation is covered with Rhododendron ponticum, a non-native and invasive variety of rhododendron introduced by the Victorians, and that this would be removed over the next five years.

In 2014, improvements were made to the Plantation to incorporate new direction signs, wheelchair-accessible pathways and toilets and a new shelter and gazebo through a project funded by the Heritage Lottery Fund. The works also incorporated de-silting of all three ponds (Peg's Pond, Thomson's Pond and Still Pond) in the Plantation and establishing new waterfalls in the streams, funded by The Royal Parks with contributions from the Friends of Richmond Park.
