= East Sheen Common =

Public space in East Sheen, London, England

Coordinates: 51.457°N 0.278°W

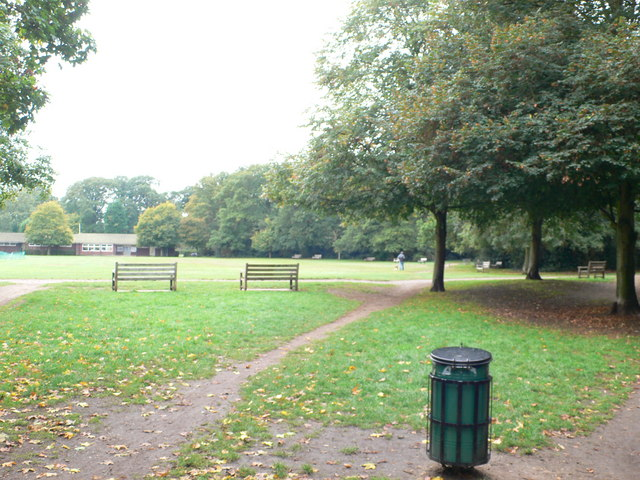
- Interactive map of East Sheen Common
- Type: Urban park
- Location: London
- Area: 18.60 hectares (45.96 acres)
- Operator: Richmond upon Thames Borough Council, on lease from the National Trust
- Status: Open all year

East Sheen Common, also known as Sheen Common, is an area of public open space in East Sheen in the London Borough of Richmond upon Thames. It is adjacent to Richmond Park and separated from it by a brick wall which forms the park's boundary. A gate, Bog Gate, provides pedestrian access between the park and the common. East Sheen Common is owned by the National Trust. It is currently leased to Richmond upon Thames Borough Council.

East Sheen Common covers 18.60 hectares (45.96 acres), consisting of woodland, a cricket field, tennis courts and a bowling green, and is a surviving, small, part of the local common land that pre-existed the creation of Richmond Park.

Sheen Park Cricket Club play matches on East Sheen Common's cricket field, which is also a venue for Ibstock Place School cricket matches.

A new woodland play area and nature trail opened at East Sheen Common in 2021. Equipment installed in the play area includes a rope tunnel, trapeze rings, an accessible wide slide, a hammock, a large raised play deck, and swings.
