= Pyl (disambiguation) =

Pyrrolysine, or Pyl, is a naturally occurring, genetically coded amino acid.

Pyl or PYL may also refer to:

- Jean Vander Pyl (1919–1999), US actress
- Paya Lebar MRT station, Singapore; by MRT station abbreviation
- Putrajaya Line, a rapid transit line in Malaysia
- Pyl Brook, London, England
- PYL Younique Volume 1, a Korean album
- Fatherland and Liberty Nationalist Front (Spanish: Patria y Libertad), Chile
- PYR1-like, a kind of abscisic acid receptor genes
