= East Pyl Brook =

River in London, England

Coordinates: 51°23′36″N 0°13′34″W

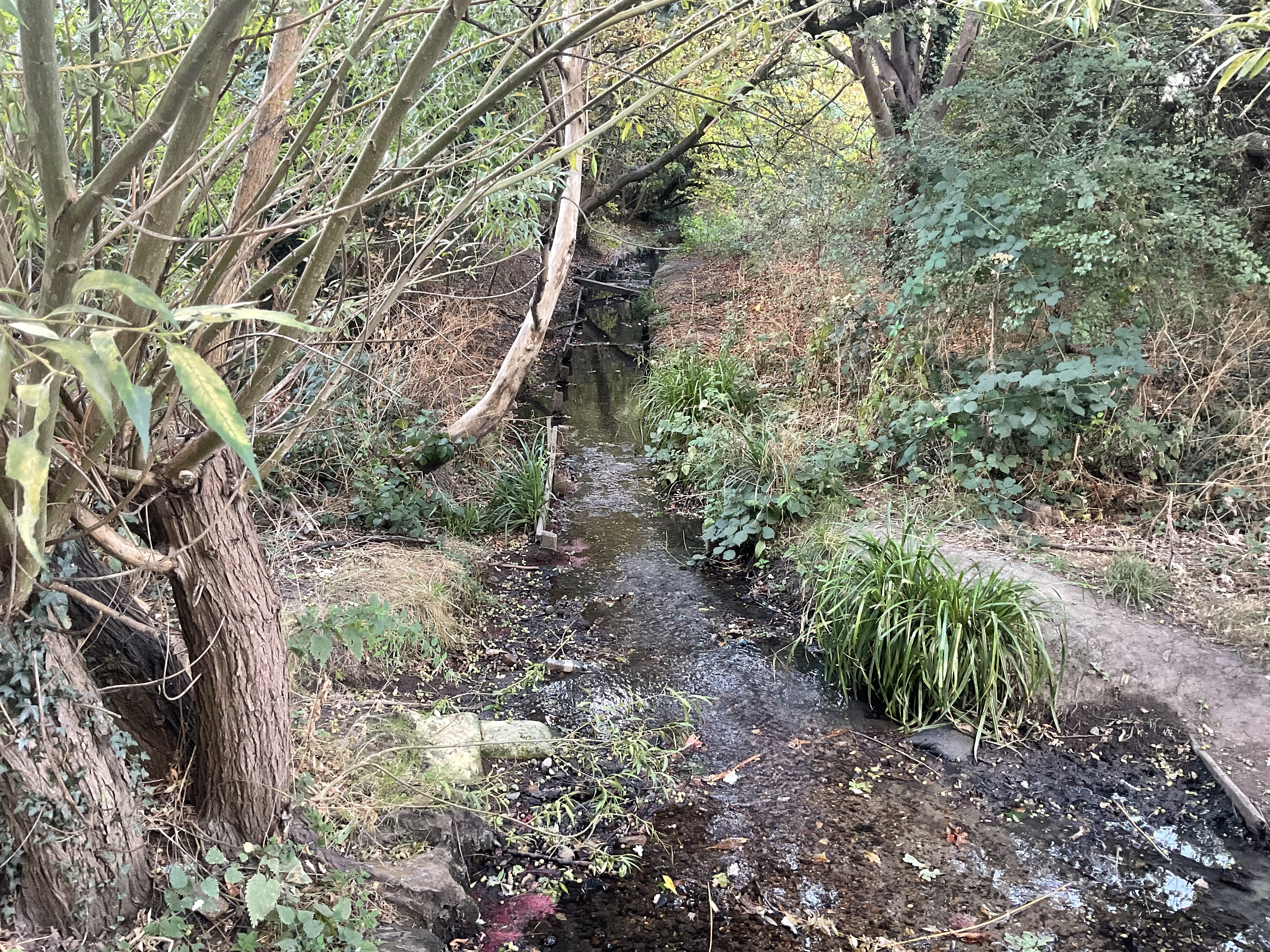
East Pyl Brook in Morden Park, looking west

East Pyl Brook is a 3.9 km (2.4 mi) long stream (brook) in Greater London, England, that is a tributary to Pyl Brook, itself a tributary of Beverley Brook.

Rising in the suburb of Rosehill in the London Borough of Sutton, East Pyl Brook flows a westerly course for its entire length. After reaching the open green space of Morden Park, Morden, in the London Borough of Merton, East Pyl Brook flows under a neighbourhood in Lower Morden via a culvert then flows into Pyl Brook, near Morden Cemetery.
