= Beverley Park =

Beverley Park may refer to

- Beverley Park, New South Wales, a suburb in southern Sydney, New South Wales, Australia
- Beverley Park, Kingston upon Thames, a public park in the Royal Borough of Kingston upon Thames, London, England
