= New Malden railway station =

National Rail station in London, England

New Malden
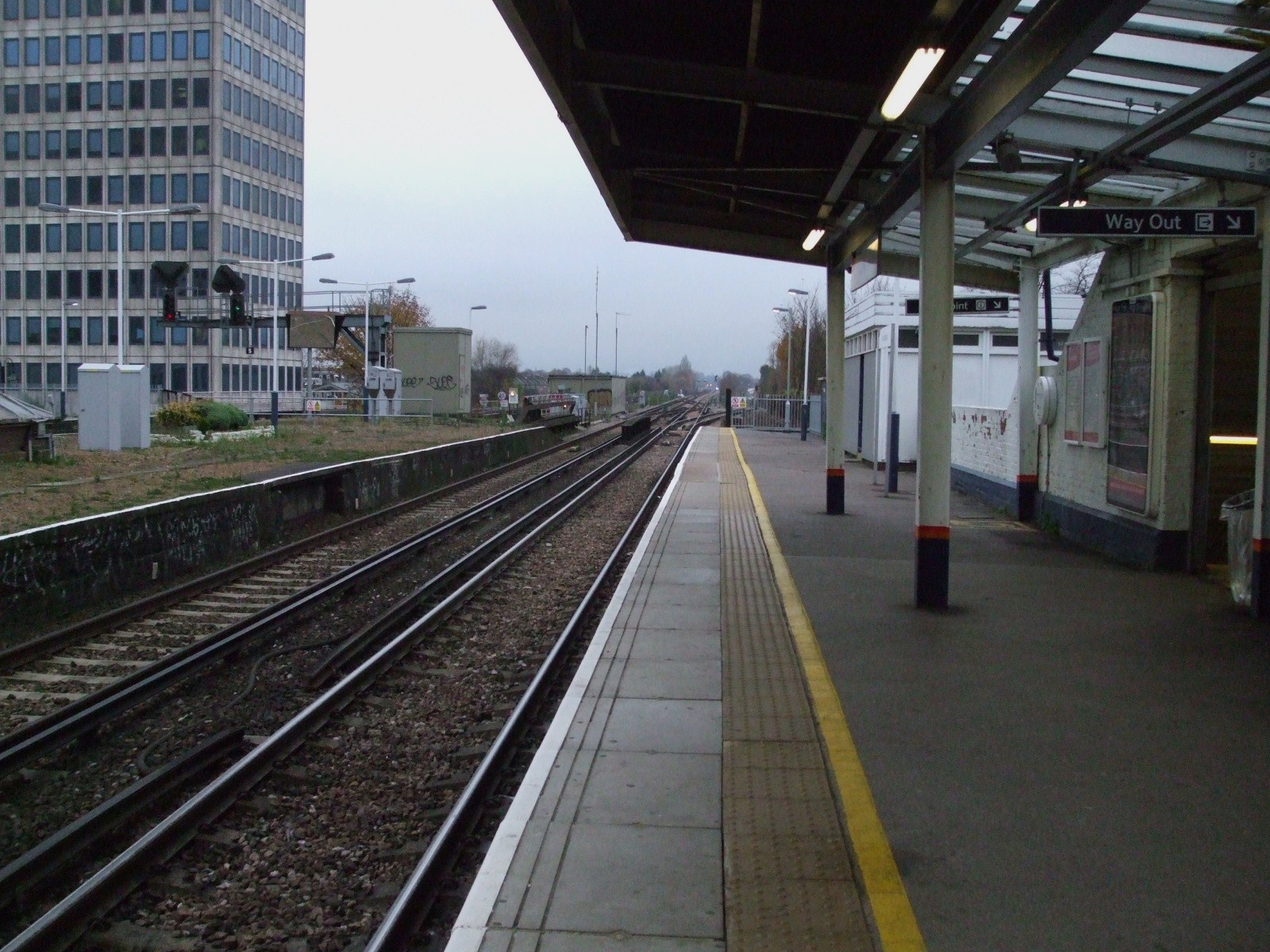
- Interactive map of New Malden

General information
- Location: New Malden
- Local authority: Royal Borough of Kingston upon Thames
- Managed by: South Western Railway
- Station code: NEM
- DfT category: C2
- Number of platforms: 4 (2 in use)
- Tracks: 4
- Accessible: Yes
- Fare zone: 4

National Rail annual entry and exit
- 2020–21: ▼0.770 million
- Interchange: ▼8,487
- 2021–22: ▲2.109 million
- Interchange: ▲22,601
- 2022–23: ▲2.563 million
- Interchange: ▲27,938
- 2023–24: ▲2.883 million
- Interchange: ▲32,648
- 2024–25: ▲3.077 million
- Interchange: ▲33,976

Key dates
- 1 December 1846: Opened as Malden
- May 1859: Renamed New Malden and Coombe
- 1 March 1862: Renamed Coombe and Malden
- November 1912: Renamed Malden for Coombe
- 1955: Renamed Malden
- 16 September 1957: Renamed New Malden

Other information
- External links: Departures; Facilities
- Coordinates: 51.4039°N 0.256°W

New Malden railway station is in the Royal Borough of Kingston upon Thames in South London. It is 9 miles 62 chains (15.7 km) south-west of London Waterloo.

The station is served by South Western Railway, and is in London fare zone 4. It is the starting point of the Beverley Brook Walk, a 11.5 km (7.1 mi) long walking route to the Thames at Barn Elms.

== History ==
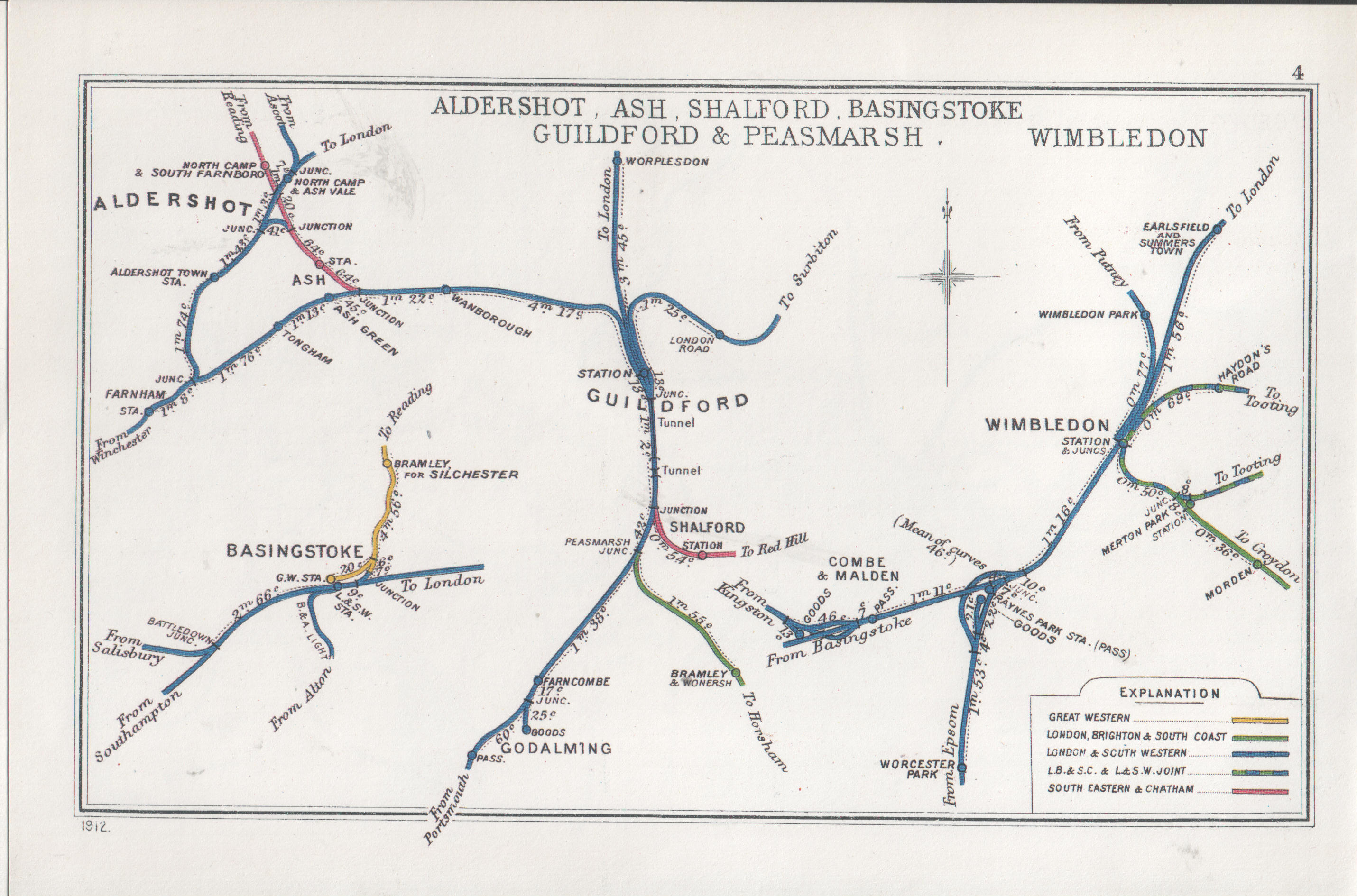
A 1912 Railway Clearing House map showing (right) lines around New Malden railway station (shown here as COMBE & MALDEN)

The station was opened by the London and South Western Railway on 1 December 1846, originally being named Malden. It has been renamed several times: in May 1859 it became New Malden and Coombe; on 1 March 1862 Coombe and Malden; in November 1912 Malden for Coombe; in 1955 Malden; and finally, on 16 September 1957, it took the present name of New Malden.

The deaths of members of station staff in an air raid during World War II is commemorated on a plaque on a wall in the ticket office and another is located on the high street opposite Waitrose.

Although still theoretically in use, Platforms 2 and 3 on the "fast" lines are not used by passengers. There are still platform boards at platforms 2 and 3 on the "fast" lines.

New platform signage was installed in 2009, adhering to the new national standard using 'Brunel' typeface in white on a navy background.

South West Trains installed automatic ticket gates in the main ticket hall in September 2009, including Oyster card readers allowing use of the Oyster "pay as you go" system.

After local opposition a proposed permanent closure of the southern entrance from Dukes Avenue and Station Avenue, which would have left only the Coombe Road entrance, was amended to opening it only for morning and evening weekday peak hours with ticket inspectors.

== Services ==
All services at New Malden are operated by South Western Railway.

The typical off-peak service in trains per hour is:

- 6 tph to London Waterloo via Wimbledon
- 2 tph to Shepperton via Kingston
- 2 tph to Teddington via Kingston, returning to London Waterloo via Richmond
- 2 tph to Hampton Court

Additional services call at the station during the peak hours.

Preceding station	National Rail	Following station
Raynes Park	South Western Railway South West Main Line	Berrylands
Raynes Park	South Western Railway Kingston Loop Line	Norbiton

== Connections ==
London Buses routes 213 and K1 serve the station.
