= Beverley Brook Walk =

Footpath in London, England

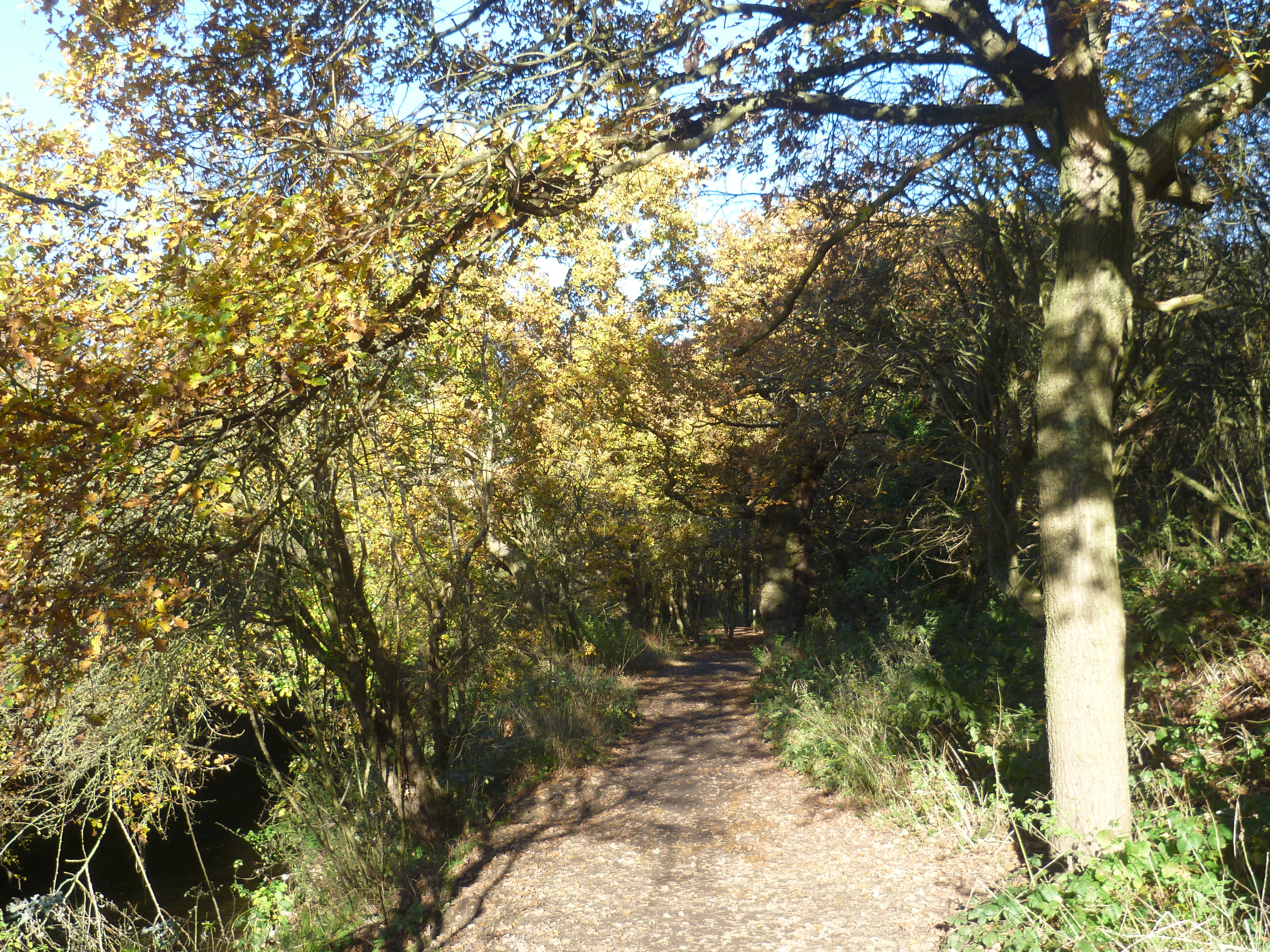
- Length: c. 11.5 kilometres (7.1 mi)
- Location: Greater London
- Use: Walking

The Beverley Brook Walk is a walking route in the south-western suburbs of London, England. It is 11.5 km (7.1 mi) long, of which the last 10.5 kilometres (6.5 mi) follows the lower reaches of the Beverley Brook, a tributary of the River Thames. It starts at New Malden railway station and ends to the north of the Putney Embankment at Barn Elms, having passed through the green spaces of Wimbledon Common, Richmond Park, Barnes Common and Putney Lower Common on its route.

The walk was created by a partnership of the London Boroughs of Kingston upon Thames, Merton, Richmond upon Thames and Wandsworth, together with the Royal Parks, the conservators of Wimbledon and Putney Commons, the Richmond branch of the Ramblers' Association and Berkeley Homes.

== Route ==
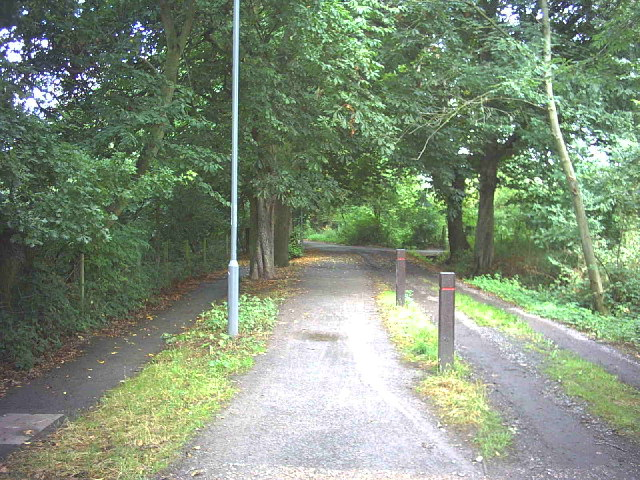
The walk crossing Malden Golf Course

The path starts at New Malden railway station and follows Coombe Road, Cambridge Avenue and a track across Malden Golf Club to intersect the Beverley Brook at the point where it passes under the A3 trunk road from London to Portsmouth. From the A3, the walk follows Westcoombe Avenue and Coombe Lane before encountering the brook again at the extreme south-western corner of Wimbledon Common.

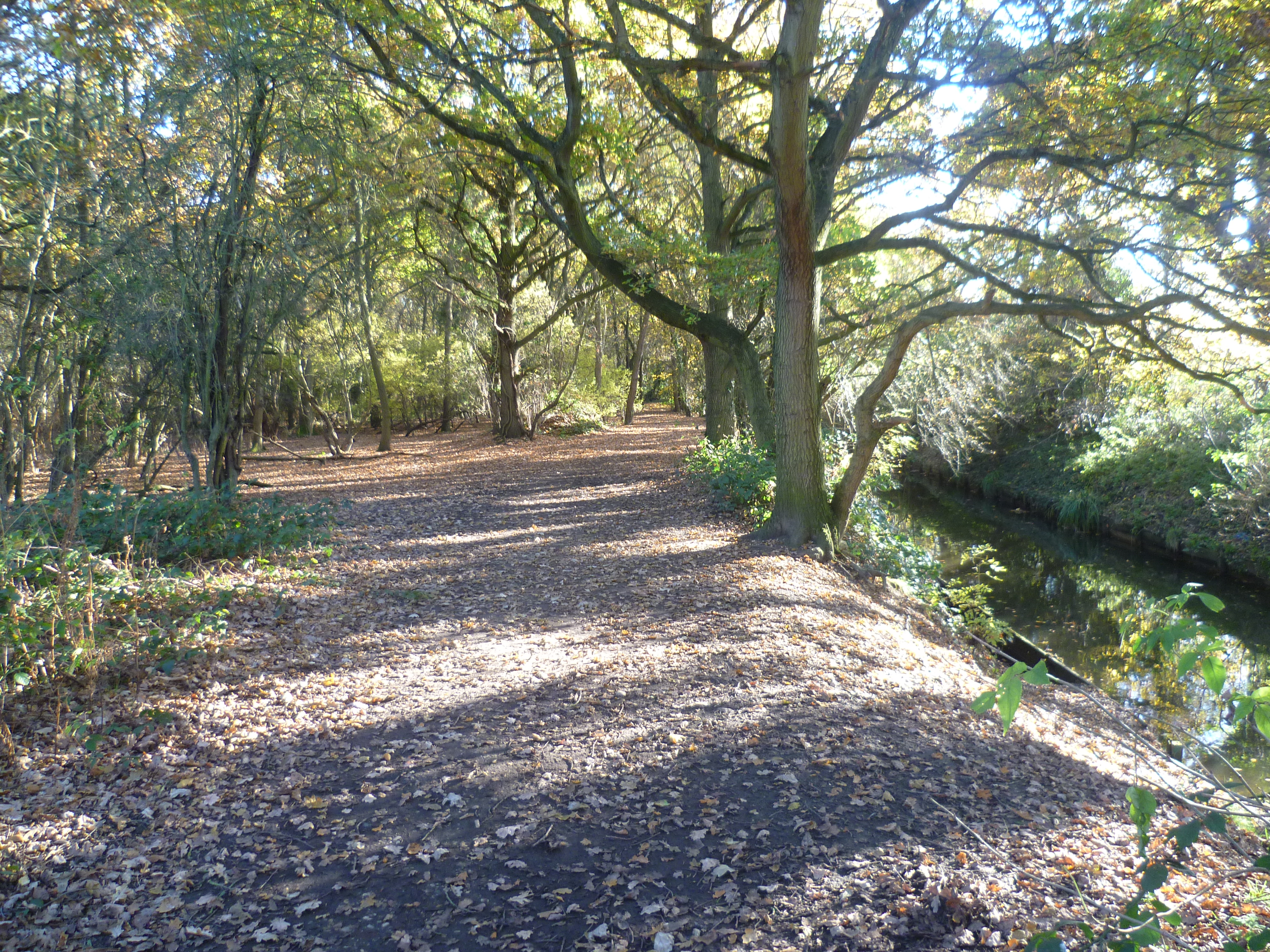
Walk and brook on Wimbledon Common

After entering Wimbledon Common, the walk closely follows the east bank of the brook along the western edge of the common for some 2.5 kilometres (1.6 mi) before reaching the A3 for a second time. Along this stretch the lightly managed woodland of the common rises to the east, with the A3 some distance to the west. Except for the playing fields, the whole of the common, including Beverley Brook, is both a Site of Special Scientific Interest and a Special Area of Conservation.

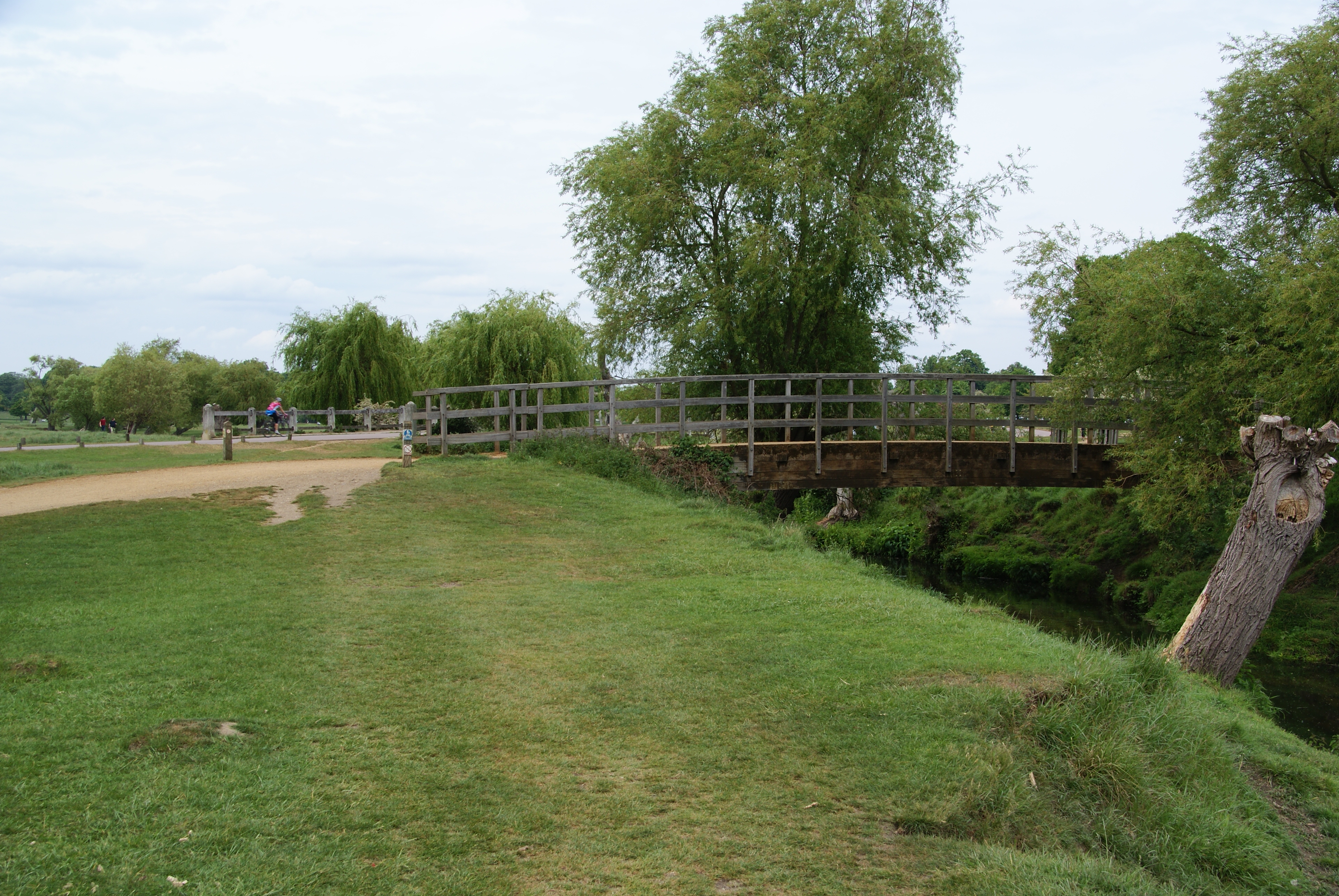
The walk crosses the brook in Richmond Park

At the second A3 crossing, the walk intersects the Capital Ring walking route before entering Richmond Park, the largest of London's Royal Parks, through Robin Hood Gate. The path then follows the brook as it flows northeast for 2 kilometres (1.2 mi) through the park, which is a Site of Special Scientific Interest and a National Nature Reserve. It was first enclosed by Charles I in 1637 and contains many ancient oak trees that pre-date its enclosure, as well as herds of red deer and fallow deer. Along this stretch the path is paralleled by the Tamsin Trail.

The path leaves Richmond Park through Roehampton Gate, and rejoins the brook for some 1.3 kilometres (0.81 mi) as it flows between Palewell Common and the Bank of England Sports Ground, before reaching the A205 Upper Richmond Road. From the A205, the walk leaves the brook and follows Priest's Bridge and Vine Road, where it passes over both the Waterloo to Reading and Hounslow Loop railway lines on adjacent level crossings, before reaching Barnes Green and Barnes Common, where it rejoins the brook.

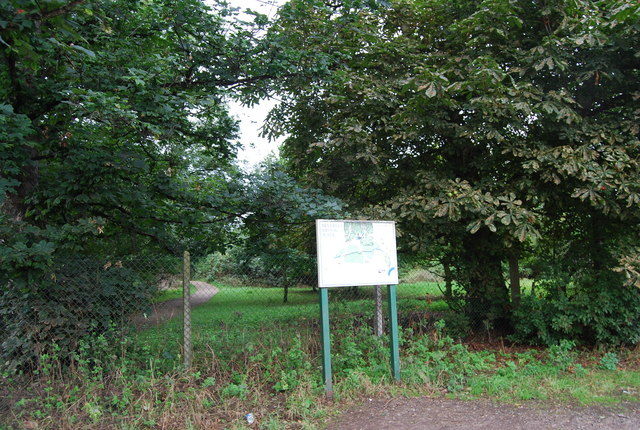
End of walk and info sign at Barn Elms

From the footbridge joining Barnes Green and Barnes Common, the path then roughly follows the brook for another 1.7 kilometres (1.1 mi) through the south of Barnes, crossing Rocks Lane and passing through the abandoned Barnes Old Cemetery before cutting between the Barnes playing fields to the north and Putney Lower Common to the south. The Thames Path is finally reached to the north of Putney Embankment between Barn Elms and Leader's Gardens.

== Access ==
The walk starts at New Malden railway station, which is on the Waterloo to Southampton railway line and served by local trains from London Waterloo, Wimbledon and Surbiton. New Malden station is also served by bus routes 213 and K1, with other routes passing nearby.

From the end of the walk, Putney lies some 1 kilometre (0.62 mi) to the east along the Thames Path, whilst Hammersmith is 2 kilometres (1.2 mi) to the west via the Thames Path and Hammersmith Bridge. Both Putney and Hammersmith have good bus and rail links to central London. Alternatively Barnes railway station, on the Waterloo to Reading railway line, is some 2.3 kilometres (1.4 mi) back along the Beverley Brook Walk.
