= Coombe Brook =

River in London, England

Coordinates: 51°24′53″N 0°14′59″W

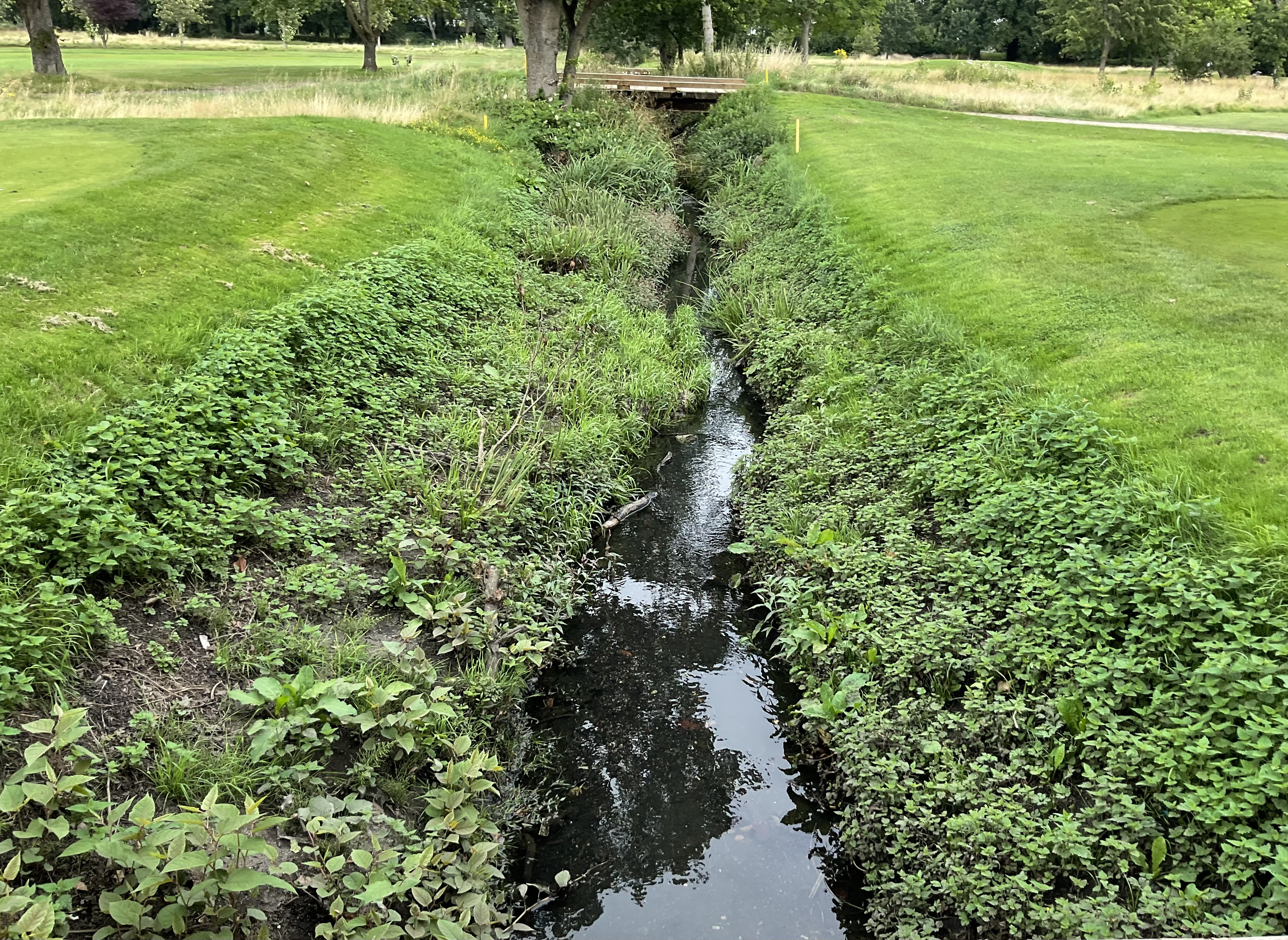
Coombe Brook, flowing through the Malden Golf Course

Coombe Brook is a 1 km (0.62 mi) long stream (brook) in the Royal Borough of Kingston upon Thames, London, England, that is a tributary to Beverley Brook, itself a tributary of the River Thames. Rising in Malden Golf Course in New Malden, Coombe Brook flows a northeasterly course through the golf course, then into a culvert under the Kingston By-pass section of the A3 road, before finally flowing into the Beverly Brook near Coombe on the boundary of the London Borough of Merton.

Historically, Coombe Brook flowed into Beverley Brook at Coombe Bridge, which had existed as early as 1745. In the 1930s, the bridge was demolished and converted into its current state—a box culvert.
