= Fishpond Wood and Beverley Meads =

Nature reserve in the London Borough of Merton, England

Coordinates: 51.424°N 0.251°W

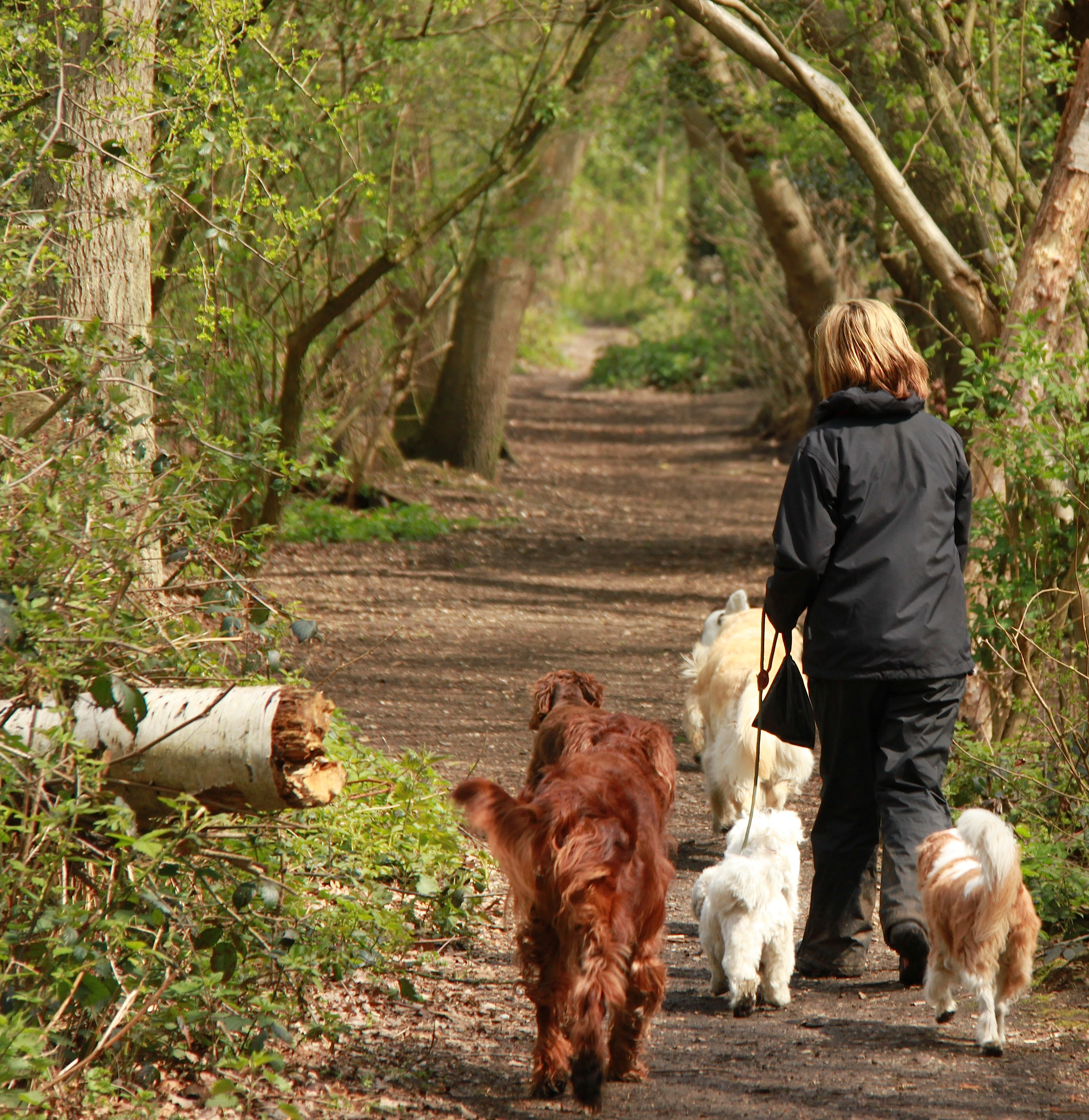
Fishpond Wood

Fishpond Wood and Beverley Meads is a 5.8 hectare local nature reserve adjacent to Wimbledon Common in the London Borough of Merton. It is owned and managed by Merton Council.

== History ==
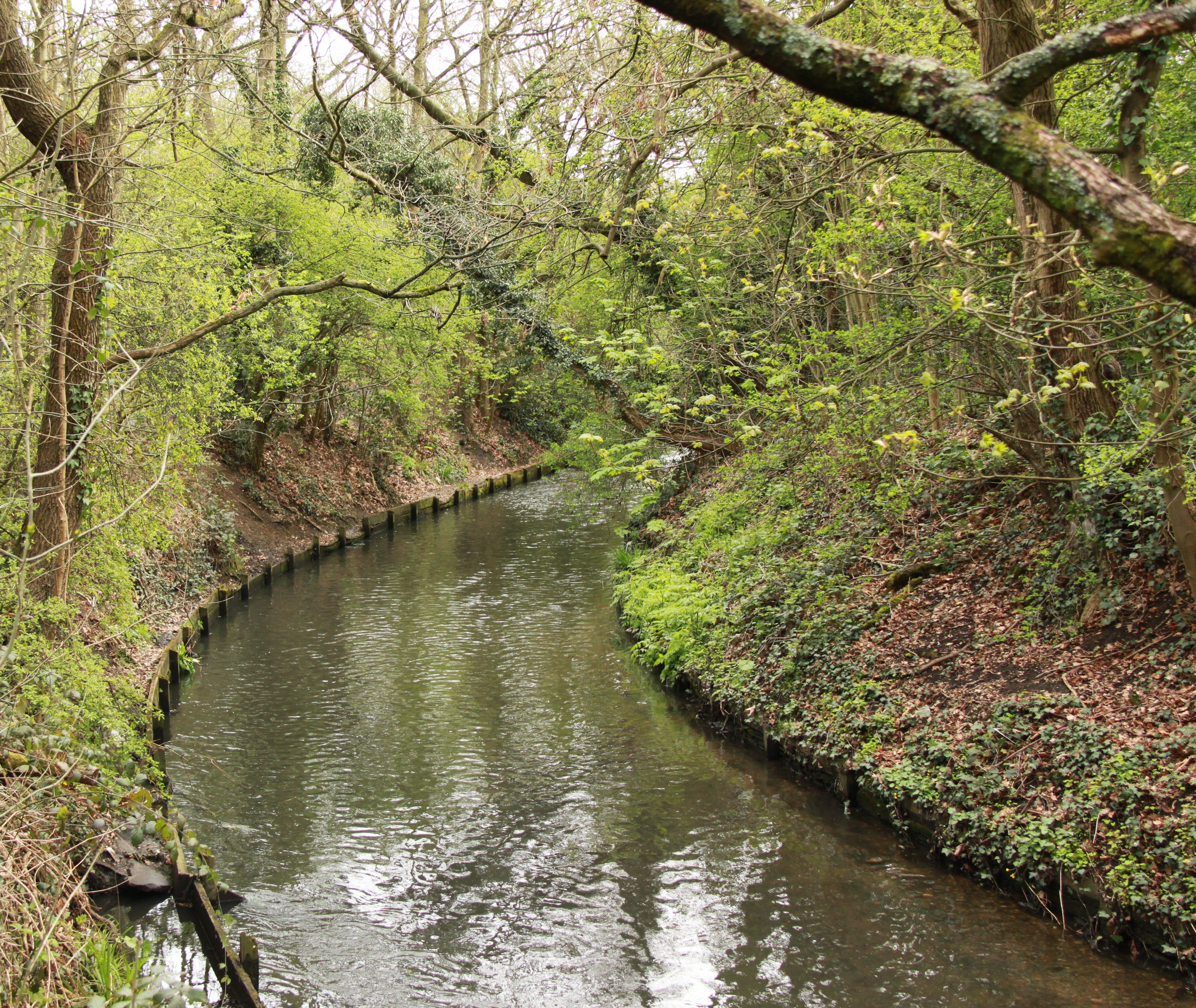
Mill Corner

In the Middle Ages Beverley Meads was owned by Merton Abbey, from which period the two ponds in Fishpond Wood are believed to date. It is likely that the watermill at Mill Corner on Beverley Brook dated from the medieval period: it was a fulling mill and is believed to have burnt down in the Tudor period. At that period the meads covered the area, since pollen analysis from the ponds indicates that the surrounding woodland developed only after the mill's demise. After the Reformation and the dissolution of Merton Abbey in 1538, the meads continued to be farmed, and was owned by Warren Farm until shortly after the Second World War.

The 'ponds' themselves are curious, for, while they may have been connected to the medieval watermill nearby, they only appear on maps from the early nineteenth century onwards. That said, since the area was described as 'waste' (common land) in the Wimbledon Manorial Rolls of 1763, it is possible that they were never viewed as worthy of recording.

In the 1950s it was acquired by Wimbledon Council for public recreation and the medieval ponds drained. In the 1970s, after Wimbledon Council was subsumed by Merton Council, it was laid out to become a pitch and putt course, which introduced foreign soil and severely damaged the once pervasive acid grassland, before being abandoned in 1981.

In the 1980s it was partly restored, with the northern pond desilted in 1989 and its breaches repaired in 1992, such that it retains water throughout most of the year. In 1993, the area became a local nature reserve. It was for some years managed by London Wildlife Trust.

== Nature ==
=== Fishpond Wood ===
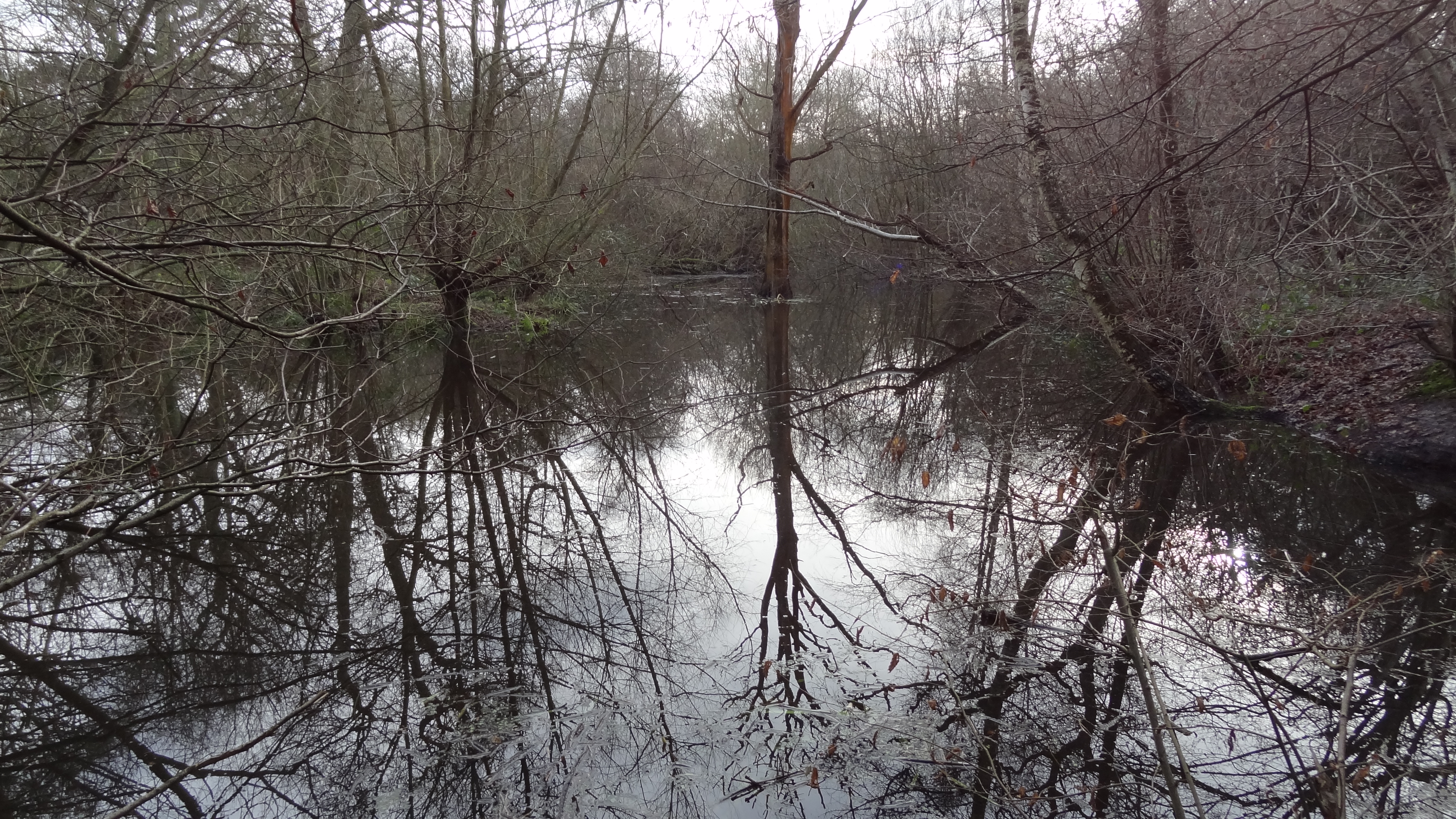
One of the Fishponds

Fishpond Wood lies adjacent to Warren Farm, and its wetlands are surrounded by old oak-hazel woodland. Around half of the hazel trees in the wood have been managed by coppicing again, although recent regeneration has been poorer, possibly owing to increasing numbers of rabbits and the arrival of muntjac deer. The ponds support a range of amphibians, including frogs (numbering around a thousand), toads and newts, as well as dragonflies and damselflies during the summer months.

A broader variety of fauna live within the wood, including wood mice, bank and short-tailed voles, common and pygmy shrews, and weasels as well as foxes, rabbits and grey squirrels, and, more rarely, pipistrelle bats. Bird life is also abundant and includes lesser and greater spotted and green woodpeckers, tree-creeper and redwings during winter, while mallards, moorhens and occasionally mandarin ducks have bred nearby.

=== Beverley Meads ===
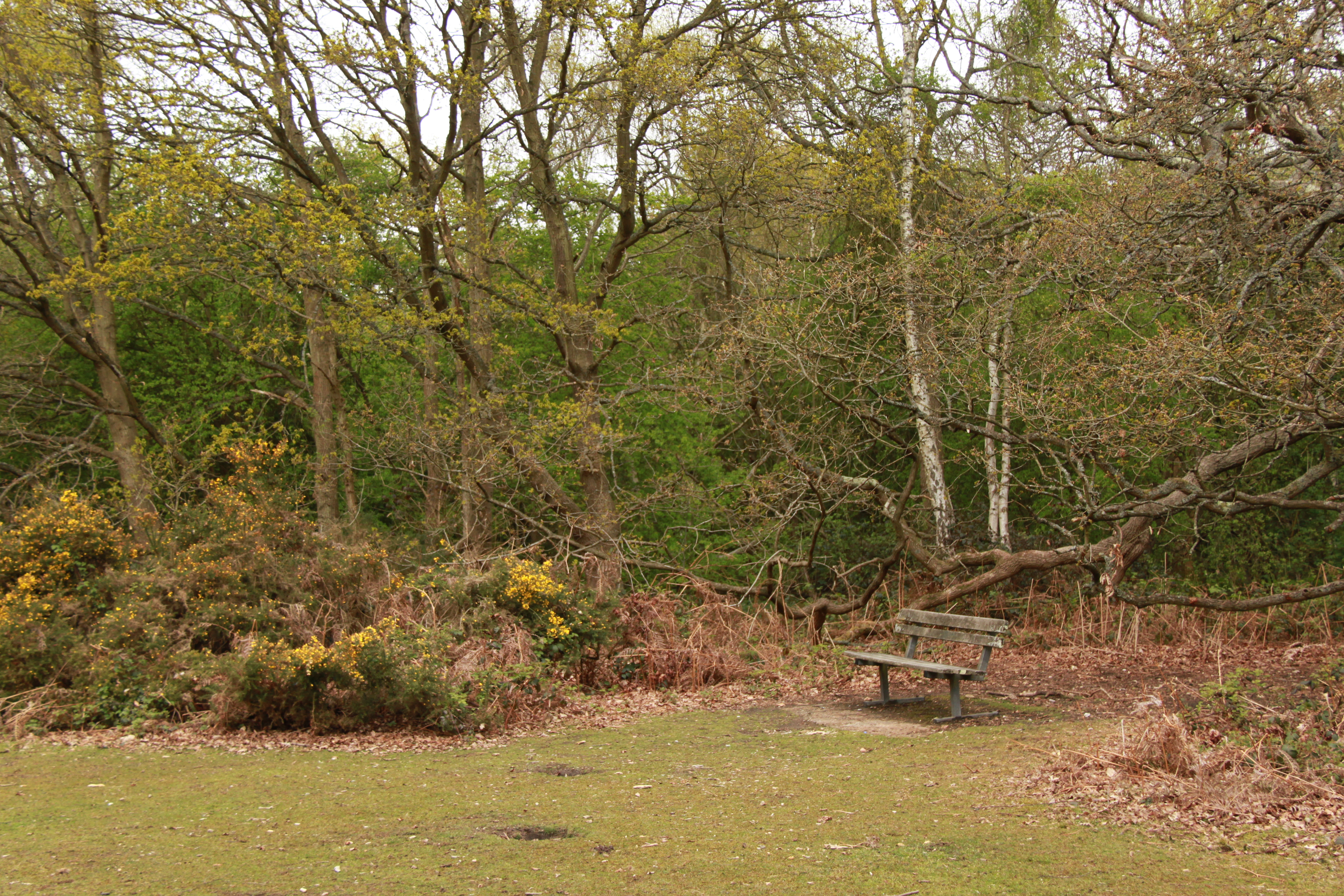
One of the Meads

Beverley Meads was used as grazing land before the War, but the four meadows ('meads') are now mostly overgrown and encroached by scrub. The remnants of the old meadows provide acid grassland, which is a rare habitat in London and important for wildlife, especially grassland butterflies. The encroachment is being battled, and scrub pushed back to encourage this grassland to recover. Local butterflies include large, Essex and small skippers, small coppers, common blues, commas, meadow browns and small heaths. As with the Wood, there is a broader range of bird life, including: green woodpeckers; blue, great, and long-tailed tits; blackcaps; and bullfinchs.

There is access to the site by footpaths from Wimbledon Common, from Barham Road via the rugby club, and from Robin Hood Way opposite Coombe Hill Road.
