= Norbiton railway station =

Railway station in England

Norbiton
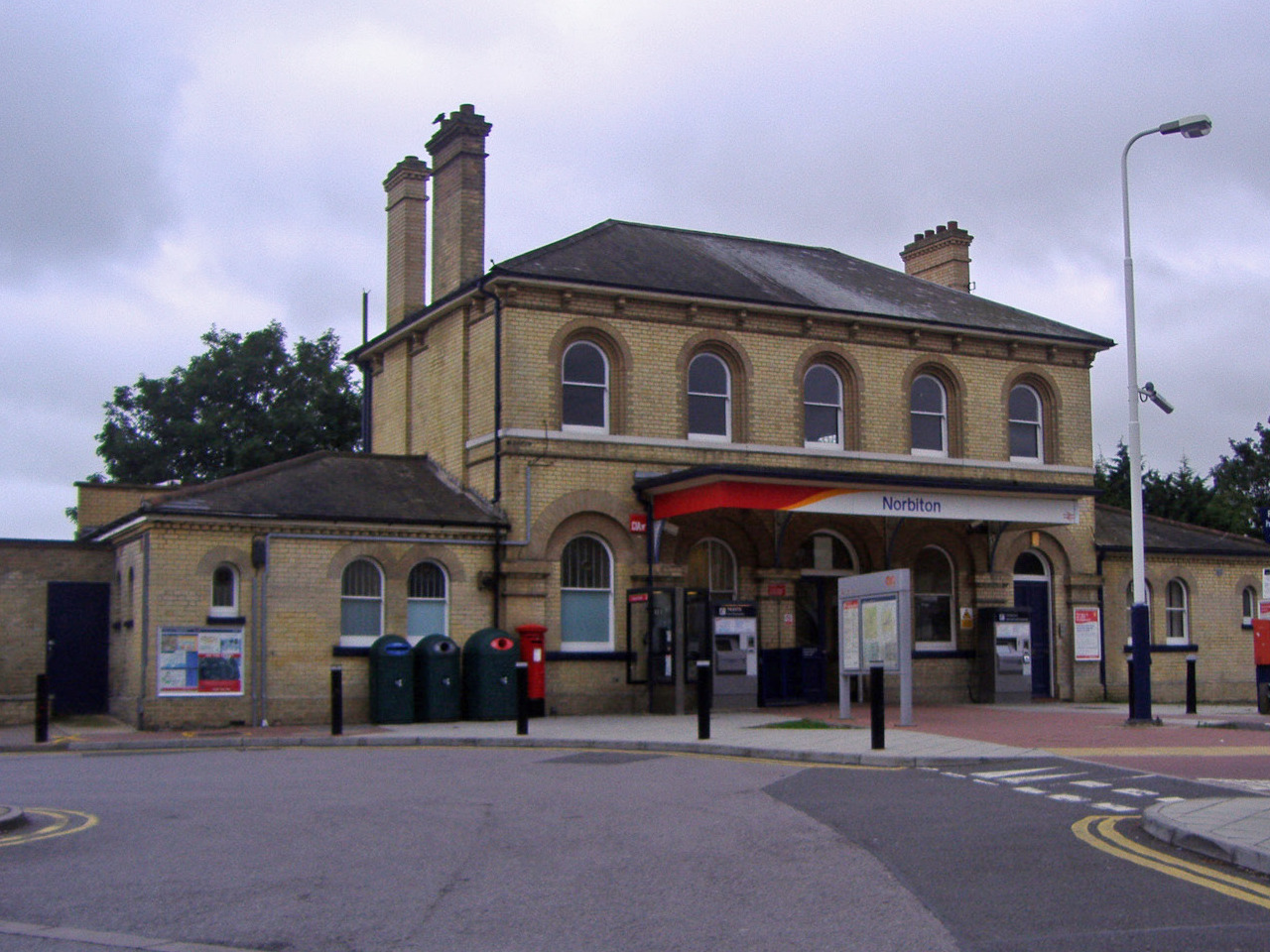
- Interactive map of Norbiton

General information
- Location: Norbiton
- Local authority: Royal Borough of Kingston upon Thames
- Managed by: South Western Railway
- Station code: NBT
- DfT category: C2
- Number of platforms: 2
- Accessible: Yes
- Fare zone: 5

National Rail annual entry and exit
- 2020–21: ▼0.603 million
- 2021–22: ▲1.384 million
- 2022–23: ▲1.771 million
- 2023–24: ▲2.101 million
- 2024–25: ▲2.270 million

Key dates
- 1 January 1869: Opened

Other information
- External links: Departures; Facilities
- Coordinates: 51.4124°N 0.2838°W

Norbiton Railway Station is a railway station located in Norbiton, a suburb in the Royal Borough of Kingston upon Thames, in southwest London. It is on the Kingston Loop Line, 11 miles 24 chains (18.2 km) down the line from London Waterloo. The station and all trains serving it are operated by South Western Railway. It is in London fare zone 5 and is a short walk from Kingston Hospital.

== History ==
Coaching interests in Kingston were opposed to having a railway in the town and consequently, the London and South Western Railway built its line to Southampton further south through Surbiton. This opposition continued even during the laying of the line from Twickenham although this line did reach a terminus in Kingston in 1863. In 1869 the line was extended through Norbiton to connect to the central line southwest of the present New Malden station.

When Queen Victoria visited distinguished residents in the Coombe Hill area, the royal train stopped at Norbiton, the only station in the area where the platform is at ground level. New Malden and Kingston have many steps. It is the only remaining Victorian railway architecture in the Royal Borough of Kingston upon Thames.

== Station facilities ==
In February and March 2012 a secure, swipe-card accessible cycle park for 50 cycles was built on Platform 1 replacing the previous set of shelters and bike racks

In August 2009 the platforms were fenced with high steel railings before the installation of ticket barriers. In 2011 the single-width 'off-peak' gated exit from platform 2 was doubled in width to cope with the large numbers of passengers leaving the station when the barriers are not operational. In 2014 the gated exit was widened again.

During the autumn of 2014, platforms 1 and 2 were raised and the edges reconstructed to reduce the step and gap for passengers getting on and off the trains. Earlier in 2014, the platforms were extended in preparation for longer trains.

There is a 38-space car park and space for 5 vehicles reserved for South Western Railway staff.

== Platforms ==
Norbiton station has two platforms.

- Platform 1 – Trains to London Waterloo via Wimbledon.
- Platform 2 – Trains to London Waterloo via Kingston & Richmond and trains to Shepperton.

== Services ==
All services at Norbiton are operated by South Western Railway.

The typical off-peak service in trains per hour is:

- 4 tph to London Waterloo via Wimbledon
- 2 tph to Shepperton
- 2 tph to Teddington, returning to London Waterloo via Richmond

On Sundays, the services to and from London Waterloo via Wimbledon are reduced to 2 tph and the services to and from Shepperton and Teddington are reduced to hourly.

Preceding station	National Rail	Following station
New Malden	South Western Railway Kingston Loop Line	Kingston

== Popular culture references ==
In the British sitcom The Fall and Rise of Reginald Perrin, the station was used as the filming location from which the title character caught his train each morning (with decreasing punctuality). Although Reggie's home town in the series was called Climthorpe, a panning shot of the front of the station in the first episode shows him walking into Norbiton station. (The area remains largely unchanged, with the Frederick W. Paine funeral parlour and the zebra crossing across Coombe Road still in place, although a small number of buildings in front of the main station entrance have since been demolished.) David Nobbs may have thought of Climthorpe as near Norbiton, since various other stations between New Malden and London are named in Reggie's multiple excuses to explain his poor punctuality .

The station also appeared briefly in a 1971 episode of the Rodney Bewes sitcom Dear Mother...Love Albert.

== Connections ==
London Buses routes 57, K2, K3, K4 and K5 serve the station.
