= Beverley Park, Kingston upon Thames =

Park in Kingston upon Thames, London, England

Coordinates: 51°24′15.55″N 0°14′46.18″W

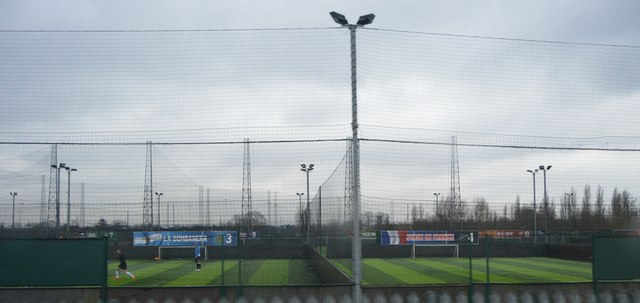
Astroturf pitches, Beverley Park

Beverley Park is a public park situated in the New Malden area of the Royal Borough of Kingston upon Thames in south-western London, England. It is the location where the Pyl Brook joins the Beverley Brook.
