= Beverley Brook =

River in London, England

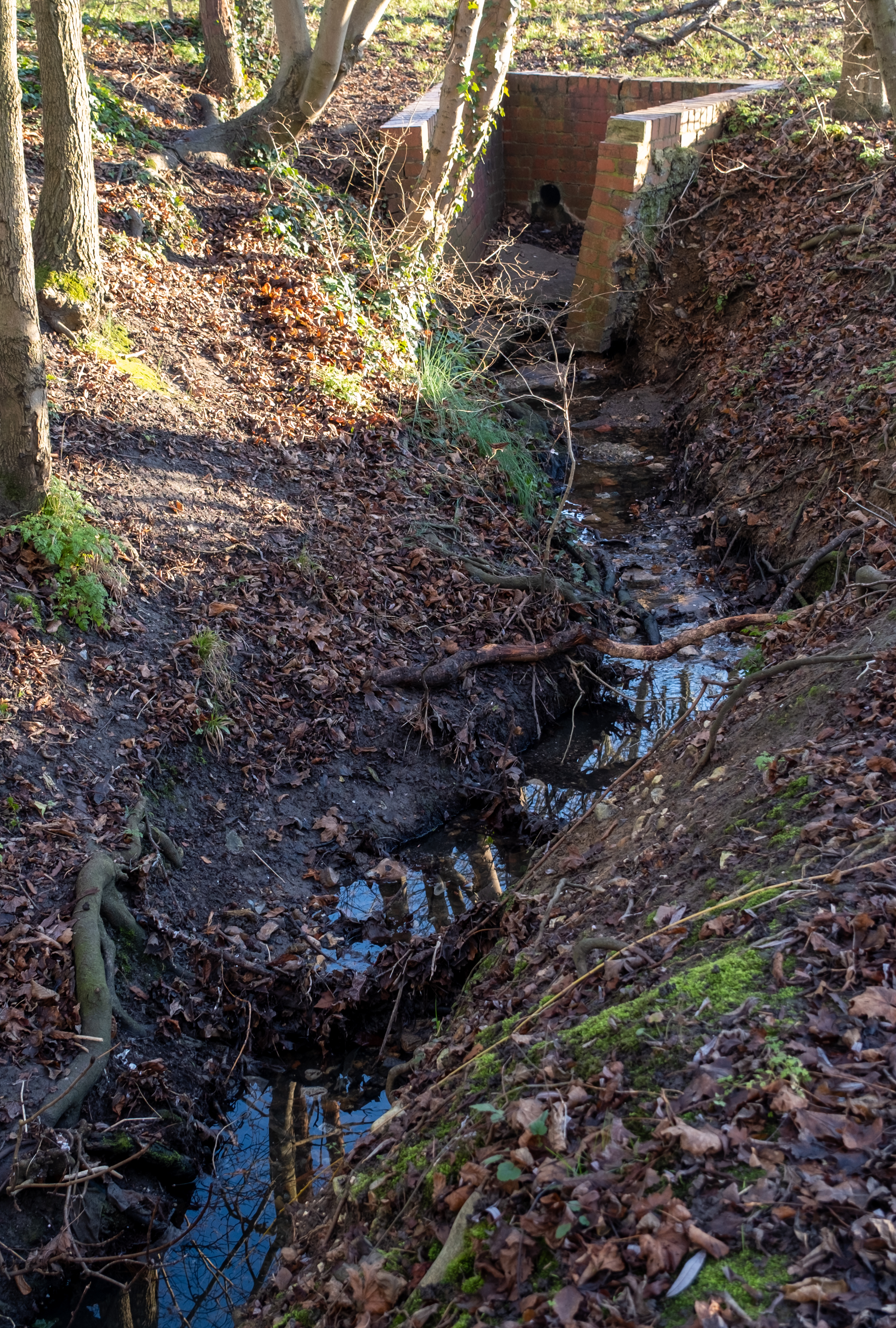
- The source of Beverley Brook in Cuddington Recreation Ground

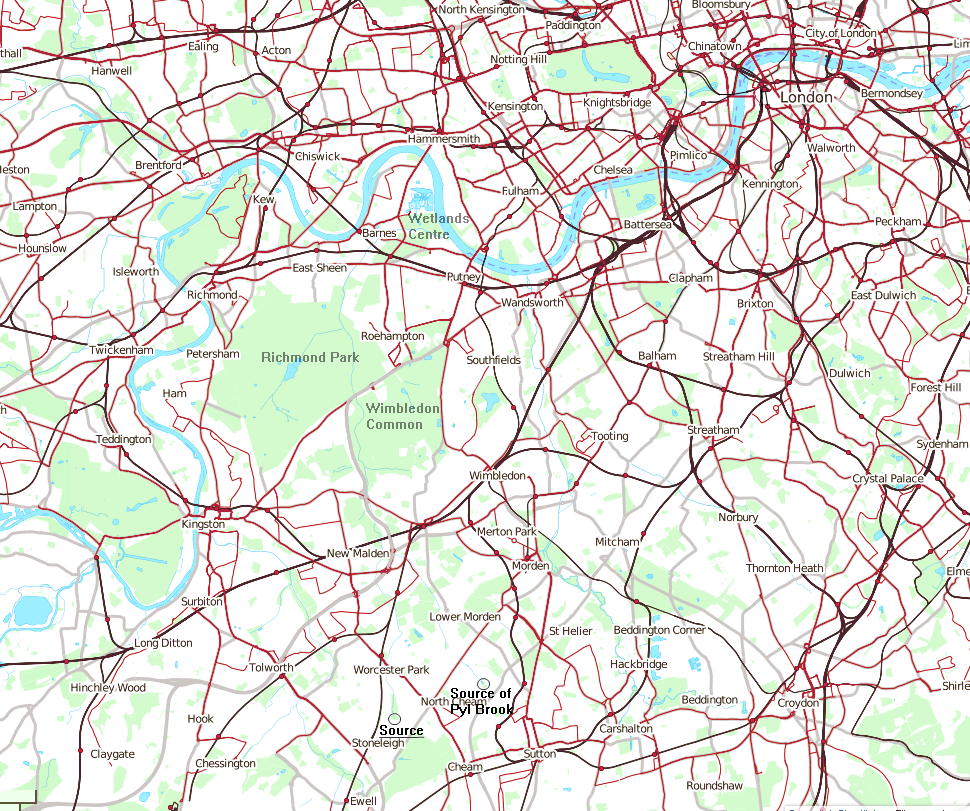
- Map of the Beverley and Pyl Brooks showing surrounding parkland and access from settlements

Location
- Country: United Kingdom

Physical characteristics
- Source
  - location: Cuddington Recreation Park, Worcester Park, Greater London
- Mouth
  - location: Barn Elms, River Thames
  - coordinates: 51°28′18.48″N 0°13′22.8″W
- Length: 14.3 km (8.9 mi)

Basin features
- Tributaries
  - left: Pen Ponds overflow, Keswick Avenue ditch, Coombe Brook
  - right: Kingsmere Stream, Queensmere Stream, Cannizaro Park stream, Pyl Brook, East Pyl Brook, Old Pyl ditch, Merton ditch culvert, Grand Drive ditch

Beverley Brook is a 14.3 km (8.9 mi)-long river in the south-western suburbs of London, England. It rises in Worcester Park and joins the River Thames to the north of the Putney Embankment at Barn Elms, having flowed through the green spaces of Wimbledon Common, Richmond Park, Barnes Common and Putney Lower Common on its course. It is followed for much of its course by the Beverley Brook Walk.

The brook has a catchment area of 64 km^{2} (25 sq mi).

== Etymology ==
The name is derived from the former presence in the river of the European beaver (Castor fiber), a species extinct in Britain since the sixteenth century. The Middle English word for beaver was bever, the word for meadow was ley (or lei or various other spellings, still rarely used today as lea) and brook meant stream, as it does today. Beverley Brook was thus the Beaver-Meadow Stream.

For some 5 kilometres (3.1 mi) to the south of Richmond Park, the brook is followed by the A3 trunk road from London to Portsmouth and that stretch of the road is named Beverley Way in consequence.

== Course ==
=== From source to Wimbledon Common ===
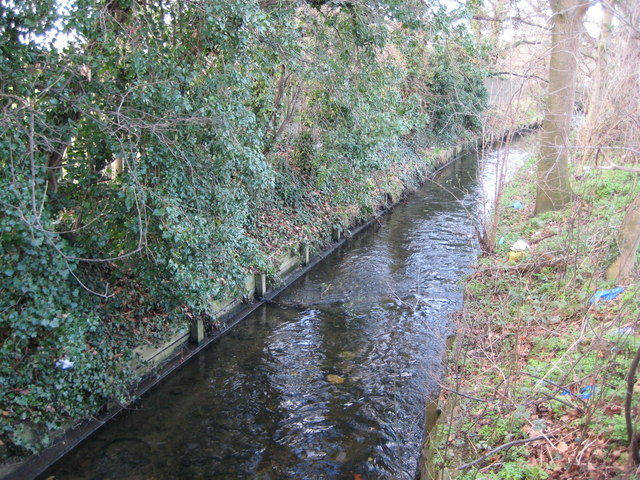
Beverley Brook in Motspur Park

Beverley Brook rises at the top of a hill in a shady area at Cuddington Recreation Ground in Worcester Park then flows north in an approximately 1 km (0.62 mi) long culvert under several residential streets and the A2043 road, emerging into an open culvert across the 4 lane interchange from The Brook pub. From here the brook flows for about 1.5 kilometres (0.93 mi) alongside Green Lane and past Green Lane Primary School to a bridge under the Raynes Park to Epsom railway line. North of the railway, it flows about 1.5 kilometres (0.93 mi) through the suburb of Motspur Park and passes under the A3 for the first time, before reaching Beverley Park, where the Pyl Brook joins from the east.

From the mouth of the Pyl Brook, the strengthened Beverley Brook flows north for just under 1 kilometre (0.62 mi), passing under the London to Southampton railway line and across Malden Golf Club before passing under the A3 for a second time. From the north side of the A3, the Beverley Brook Walk follows, at times more closely than others, the brook to its mouth. From the A3, the brook passes through a residential area for about 500 metres (1,600 ft) before passing under Coombe Lane and entering Wimbledon Common at its extreme south-western corner.

=== Wimbledon Common and Richmond Park ===
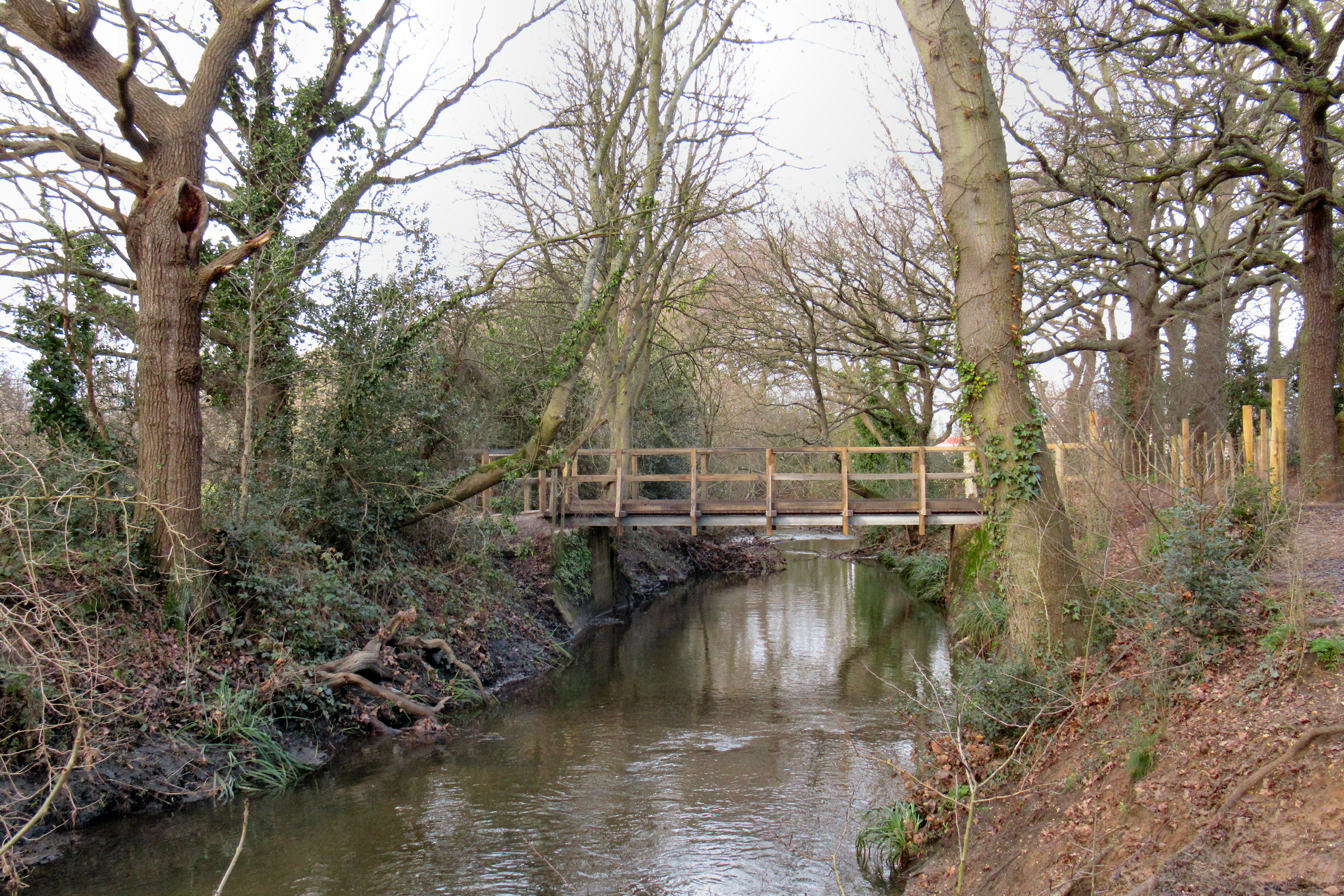
Beverley Brook on Wimbledon Common

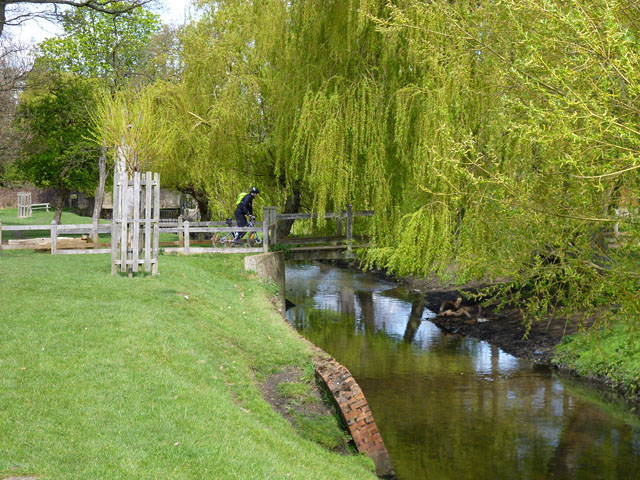
Beverley Brook in Richmond Park

After entering Wimbledon Common, the brook passes along the western edge of the common for some 2.5 kilometres (1.6 mi) before passing under the A3 for a third time. Along this stretch the lightly managed woodland of the common rises to the east of the brook, with the A3 some distance to the west. Except for the playing fields, the whole of the common, including Beverley Brook, is both a Site of Special Scientific Interest and a Special Area of Conservation. Towards the south (upstream) end of the common, Fishpond Wood and Beverley Meads nature reserve lies a few metres east of the stream.

After passing under the A3, the brook then flows northeast for 2 kilometres (1.2 mi) through Richmond Park, the largest of London's Royal Parks. The park is a Site of Special Scientific Interest and a National Nature Reserve and was first enclosed by Charles I in 1637. It contains many ancient oak trees that pre-date its enclosure, as well as herds of red deer and fallow deer. Within the park the Beverley Brook creates a water feature used by the deer, smaller animals, water grasses and some water lilies. Along this stretch the brook is followed by the Tamsin Trail as well as the Beverley Brook Walk.

=== Richmond Park to the Thames ===
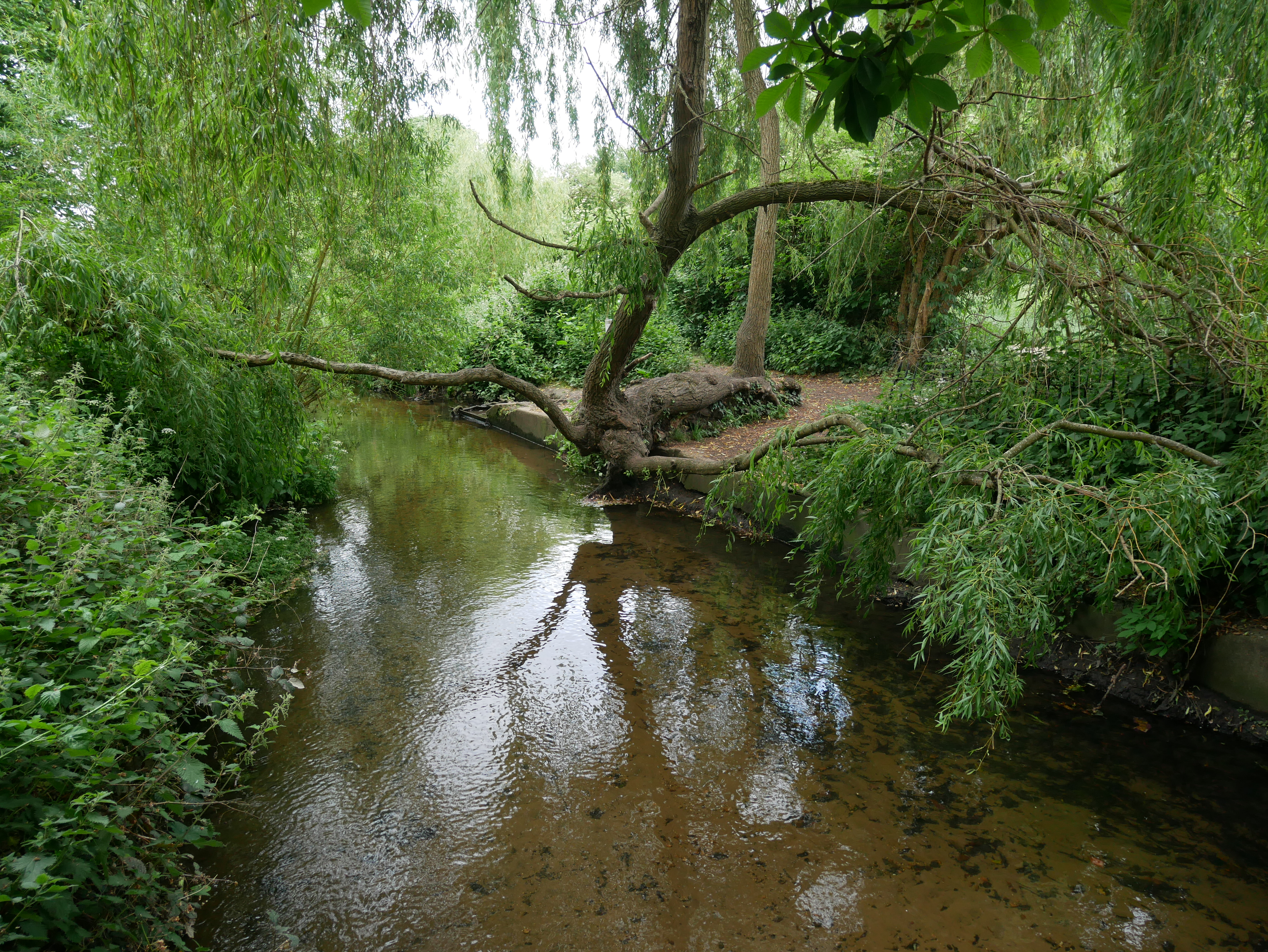
The Beverly Brook as it passes between Barnes Green and Barnes Common

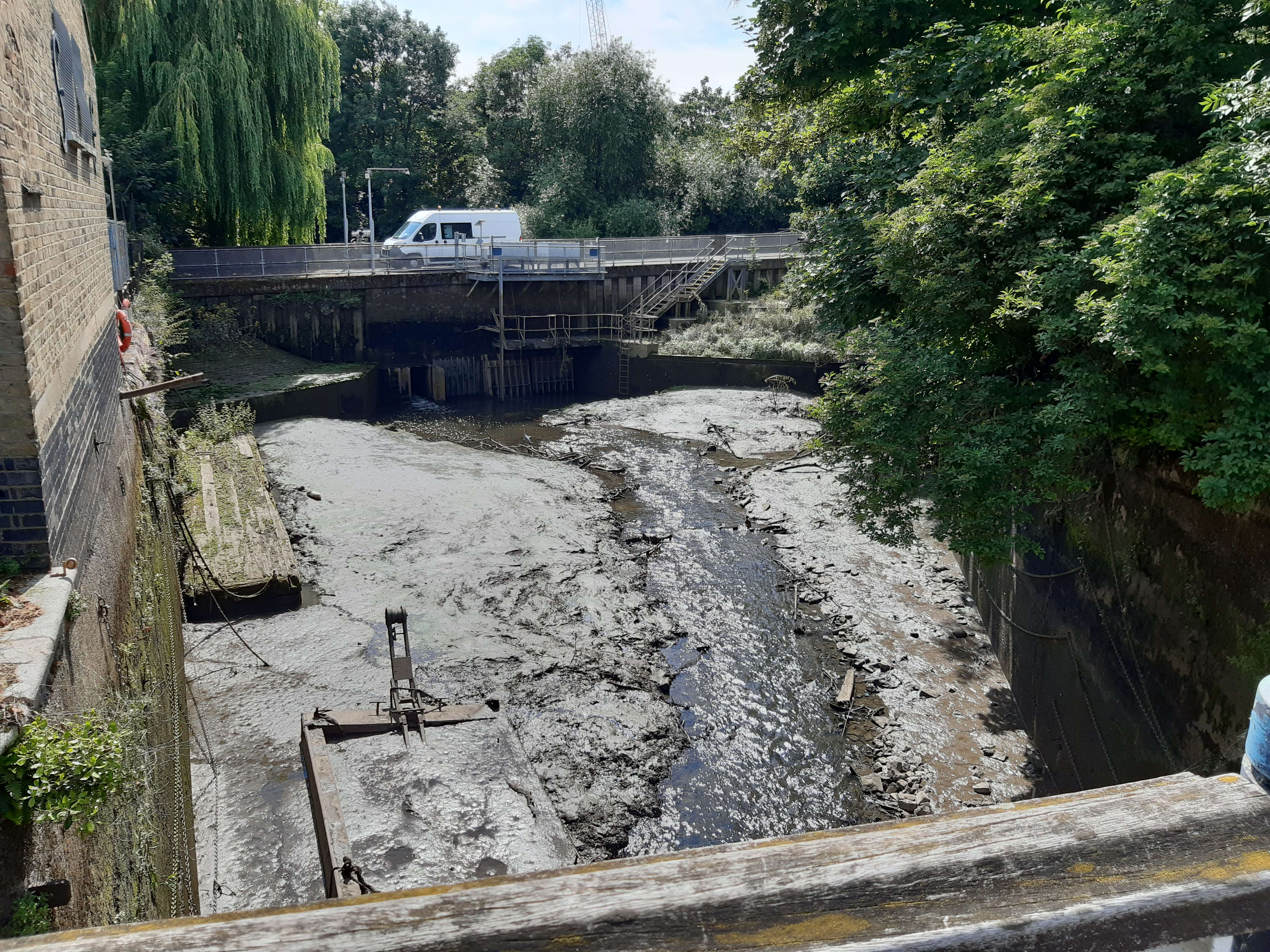
Beverley Brook from Thames towpath, just before it discharges into the River Thames

After leaving Richmond Park, the brook flows for some 1.3 kilometres (0.81 mi), passing alongside Palewell Common and the Bank of England Sports Ground, before passing under the A205 Upper Richmond Road and reaching Priest's Bridge. At Priest's Bridge, a weir and culvert exist to take flood water directly to the Thames.

The brook then continues some 850 metres (2,790 ft) in a north-easterly direction, passing under both the Waterloo to Reading and Hounslow Loop railway lines in close succession, before reaching Barnes Green and Barnes Common. Here the brook flows under a footbridge linking the two open spaces. Despite the Thames being under 500 metres (1,600 ft) to the north-west along this stretch, the brook here turns east and heads across the base of the peninsular formed by the larger river's meander around Barnes.

The brook then flows for another 1.7 kilometres (1.1 mi) through the south of Barnes, passing between the Barnes playing fields to the north and Putney Lower Common to the south, and joins the River Thames between Barn Elms and Leader's Gardens.

=== Beverley Brook as a boundary ===
The Beverley Brook lies entirely within Greater London but flows through a number of London boroughs. It rises in the borough of Sutton, which it remains in until Green Lane Primary School, where it briefly becomes the boundary between the boroughs of Sutton and Kingston upon Thames, before becoming the boundary between the boroughs of Kingston upon Thames and Merton. This historic South West London boundary continues for the next 7 kilometres (4.3 mi) until just before the brook flows into Richmond Park, where the brook briefly becomes the boundary between the boroughs of Kingston on Thames and Wandsworth.

Once in Richmond Park, the river passes into the borough of Richmond. After leaving Richmond Park, the brook briefly forms the boundary between the boroughs of Richmond and Wandsworth, before flowing back into the borough of Richmond near Priest's Bridge. It remains in that borough until it reaches Putney Lower Common, where it again forms the boundary between the boroughs of Richmond and Wandsworth as far as the Thames.

== Tributaries ==
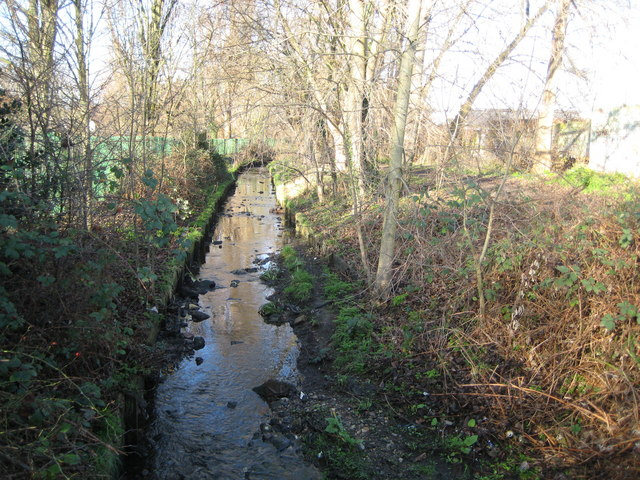
The Pyl Brook in North Cheam, a right bank tributary

Beverley Brook's longest tributary is Pyl Brook, 5.3 km (3.3 mi) long, which is a Local Nature Reserve. It flows from Sutton through Lower Morden to join it at Beverley Park in New Malden. Both brooks are on the Environment Agency's watchlist of rivers susceptible to flooding.

== Environmental improvements ==
For much of the twentieth century, Beverley Brook was joined by poorly treated sewage from a sewage works in Green Lane, Worcester Park. Since some pipe redirection enabling the removing of the works and the introduction of improved treatment methods in 1998, the range of wildlife species in the river has steadily increased.

At Wimbledon Common, Beverley Brook has banks reinforced with wooden "toe-boarding", which prevents use by water voles, and there is scope for further such improvements.

== In fiction ==
Beverley Brook is a regular character in Ben Aaronovitch's series of urban fantasy police procedural novels Rivers of London. She describes her kind thus: "'Orisa', said Beverley. 'We're Orisa. Not spirits, not local geniuses – Orisa'."

== See also ==
- Tributaries of the River Thames
- List of rivers of England

Next confluence upstream	River Thames	Next confluence downstream
Stamford Brook (north)	Beverley Brook	River Wandle (south)
