= Pyl Brook =

Tributary of Beverley Brook in southwest London, England

Coordinates: 51.387°N 0.203°W

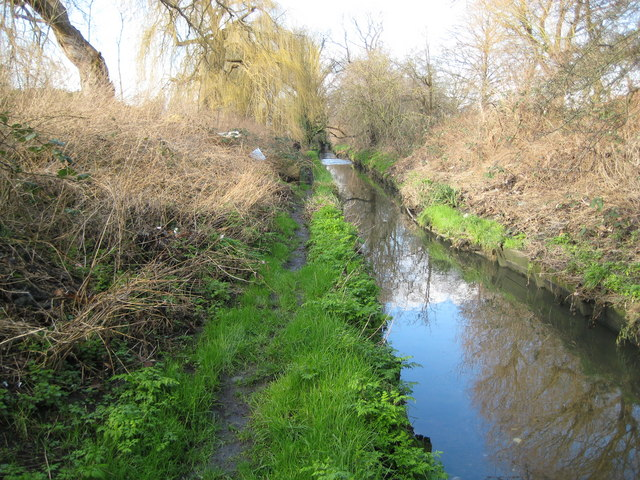
Pyl Brook in Morden

Pyl Brook is a small stream in southwest London. It is a tributary of Beverley Brook, itself a tributary of the River Thames. Pyl Brook has two sources. The 5.3 kilometre main brook rises in Sutton Common in Sutton and flows through the London Borough of Merton to join Beverley Brook at Beverley Park in New Malden. The 3.9 kilometre East Pyl Brook also rises in Sutton and flows through Merton, joining the main Pyl west of Grand Drive in Raynes Park.

The most common consensus among historians is that "Pyl" derives from the Old English word pyll, which translates to a pool, a tidal creek, or a localized well. In early Saxon Charters, the word pyl was frequently used simply to denote a small stream or brook. The name 'Pyl' could also derive from Celtic, with a very similar set of meanings – 'pwll' in modern Welsh is a pool or stream so the name may pre-date Anglo-Saxon settlement and reflect the ancient Celtic-speaking Britons.

== Local Nature Reserves ==
Two sections of the East Pyl are nature reserves. Pyl Brook Local Nature Reserve is an area of 1.3 hectares between the brook and the back gardens of houses in Rutland Drive, Morden. It is also a Site of Borough Importance for Nature Conservation, Grade II. In the mid-1980s the London Wildlife Trust adopted the site, but it is no longer on their portfolio of reserves. It has mature hawthorn and elm scrub, with areas of crack-willow, elder, blackthorn and bramble. The entrance gate on a path which crosses the site is kept locked and there is no public access.

The brook also passes through Morden Park Local Nature Reserve.
