= Palewell Park =

Park in East Sheen, London, England

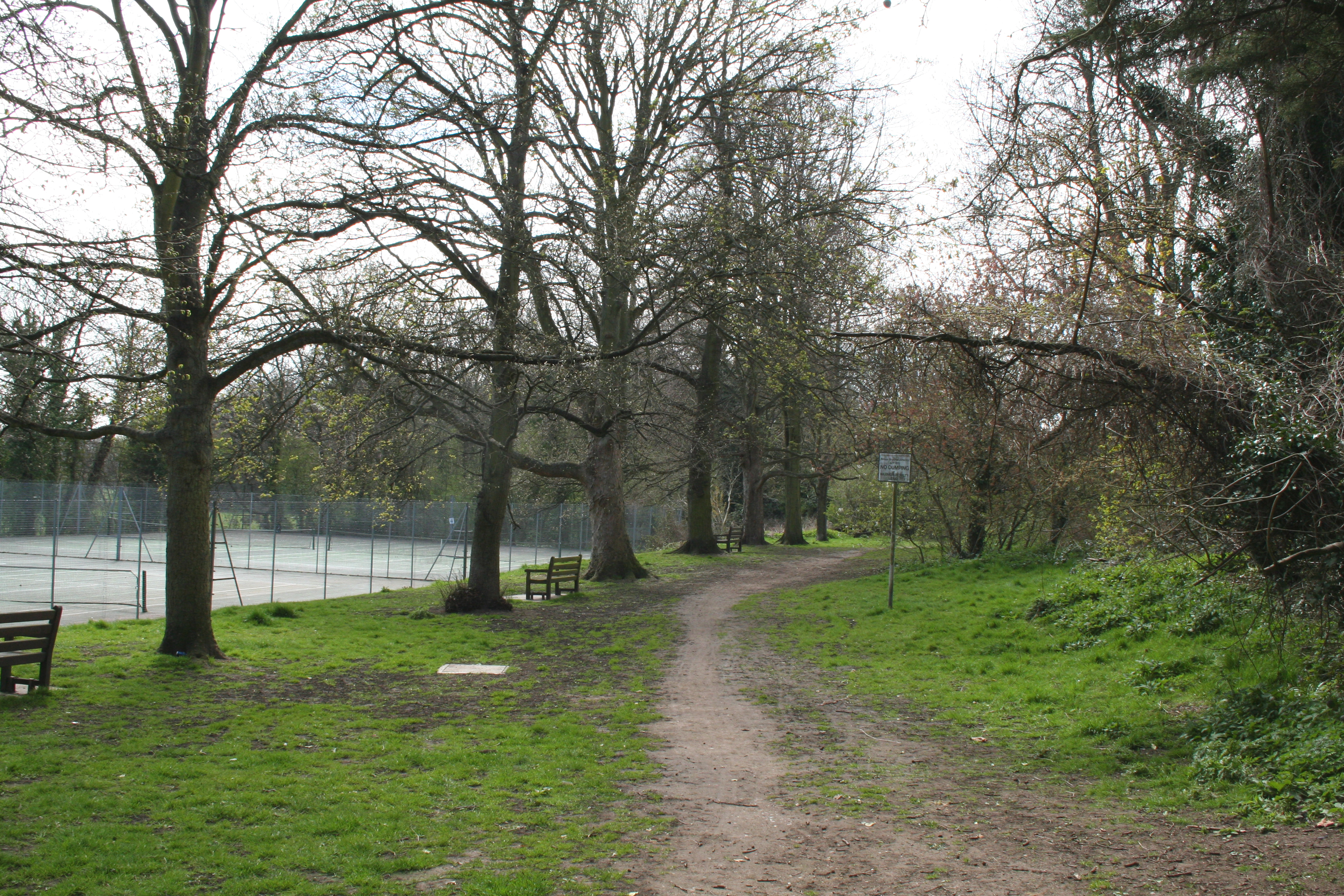
- Footpath in Palewell Park with tennis courts on the left
- Interactive map of Palewell Park
- Type: Urban park
- Location: London
- Coordinates: 51.4589°N 0.2602°W
- Area: 12 hectares (29.65 acres)
- Operator: London Borough of Richmond upon Thames
- Status: Open all year

Palewell Park or Palewell Common is a public park in East Sheen adjacent to Richmond Park which it is connected to by a footpath and gate through its boundary wall. Beverley Brook runs along the eastern edge of the park.

The park is a mix of woodland and fields and covers an area of roughly 12 hectares (30 acres). The park hosts facilities including football pitches, tennis courts, a pitch and putt course as well as a playground. The north-west corner originally held a well and later an artificial pond which was filled in.

"Palewell Park" is also the title and subject of an instrumental song by Bruford on their 1980 album Gradually Going Tornado.
