= Kingston loop line =

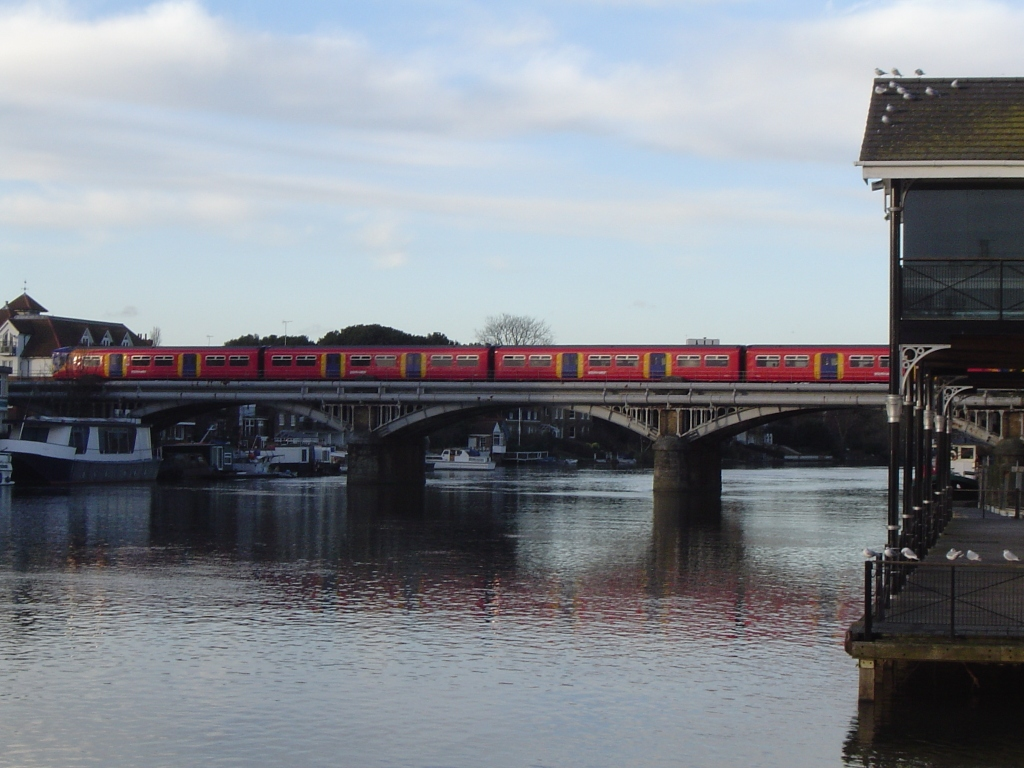
- Class 455 crossing Kingston Bridge

Overview
- Status: Operational
- Owner: Network Rail
- Locale: Greater London

Service
- Type: Commuter rail
- System: National Rail
- Operator: South Western Railway
- Rolling stock: Class 450; Class 458; Class 701

History
- Opened: 1 July 1863/1 Jan 1869

Technical
- Number of tracks: 2
- Track gauge: 4 ft 8 1/2 in (1,435 mm) standard gauge
- Electrification: Third rail, 750 V DC
- Operating speed: 60 mph (97 km/h)
Route map
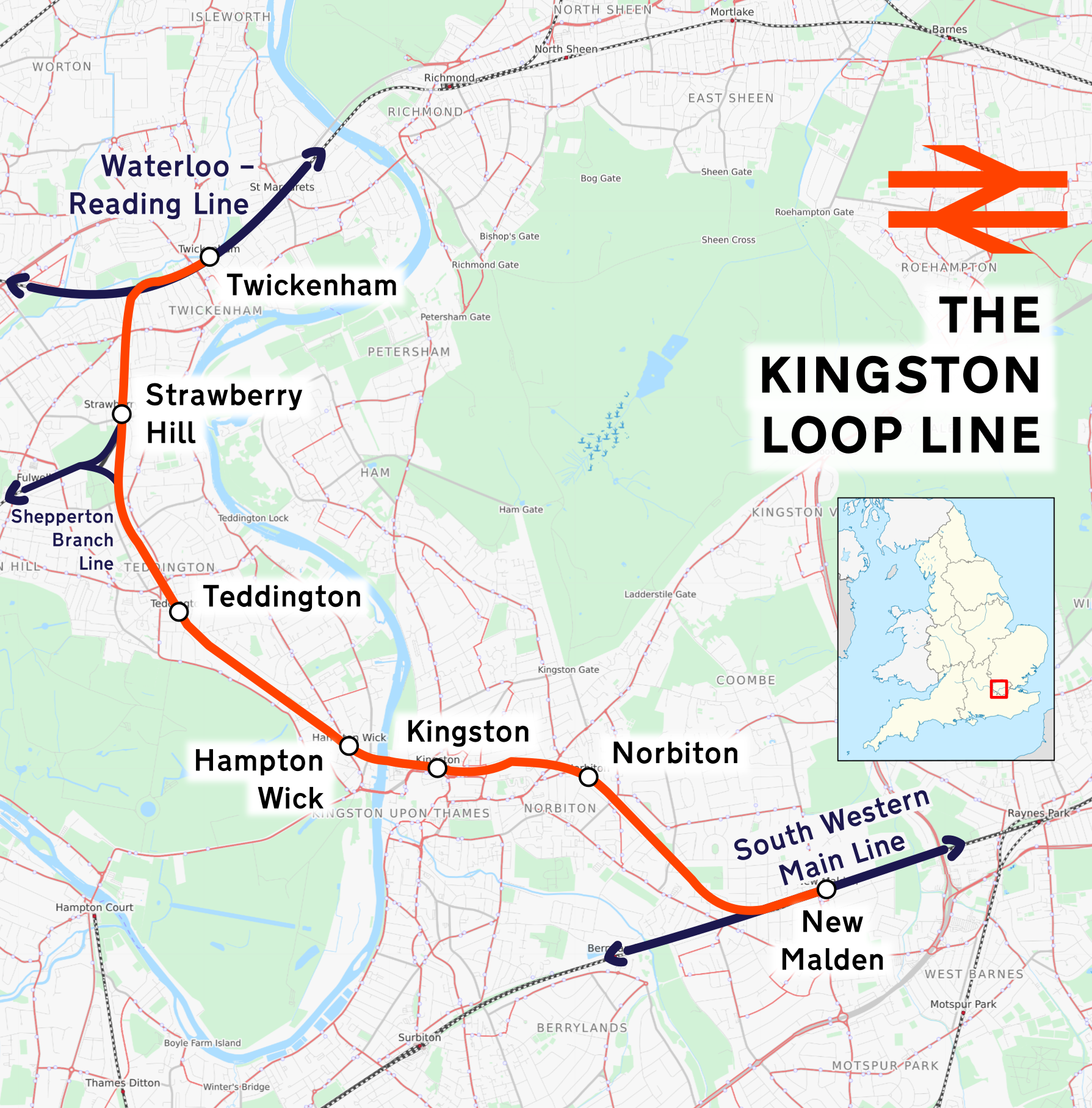
(Click to expand)

The Kingston loop line is a railway line built by the London and South Western Railway (L&SWR) in South West London. It was built in two stages, the first of which was opened in 1863 and ran from Twickenham to Kingston. Travel from Kingston to London by that route was a rather circuitous trip. Later, the line was extended from Kingston to Wimbledon in 1869. The line ran independently alongside the Southampton main line from Malden to Wimbledon - where the line connected to other railway lines, which gave access to Ludgate Hill in the City of London, as well as to Waterloo.

When the main line was widened to four tracks in 1884, a direct junction between the Kingston line and the main line was made at New Malden. A grade-separated junction was made to avoid conflicts with main line trains, and after that time the Kingston loop is considered to extend from Twickenham to New Malden only. The Shepperton branch line, opened in 1864, was connected into the Kingston Loop at Strawberry Hill and a triangular junction was later formed there.

The line was electrified in 1916 and a very frequent and attractive train service was put on, encouraging a considerable increase in passenger volume. Usage and train frequency have declined somewhat in recent years, but the line is still an important residential travel artery; Kingston remains an important shopping centre and attracts off-peak travel.

== History ==
The London and Southampton Railway opened its main line from Nine Elms (London) to Woking Common on 21 May 1838. It had a station called Kingston, but it was some distance from the centre of the town. Considerable residential and commercial development took place around the new Kingston station over the years, but the traditional centre of Kingston continued to thrive.

The L&SR continued its main line to Southampton, and it changed its title to the London and South Western Railway in 1839. The line was extended eastwards from the Nine Elms terminus, opening a station at Waterloo, and first named Waterloo Bridge, in 1848.

=== Richmond, and Windsor to London ===
The independent Richmond Railway obtained an authorising act of Parliament, the Richmond (Surrey) Railway Act 1845 (8 & 9 Vict. c. cxxi), to build from Richmond to Falcon Bridge, Wandsworth, at the present day Clapham Junction. It opened its line on 27 July 1846, and soon sold its concern to the LSWR, effective on 31 December 1846.

Another independent concern was the Windsor, Staines and South Western Railway. The Windsor, Staines, and South-western Railway Act (No. 1) 1847 (10 & 11 Vict. c. lviii) authorised construction from Richmond through Twickenham to Datchet, and a loop line that we now know as the Hounslow Loop. The intention was to extend from Datchet to Windsor. The line opened from Richmond to Twickenham and Datchet on 22 August 1848. The WS&WR company was merged with the LSWR on 30 June 1850.

=== Twickenham to Kingston ===
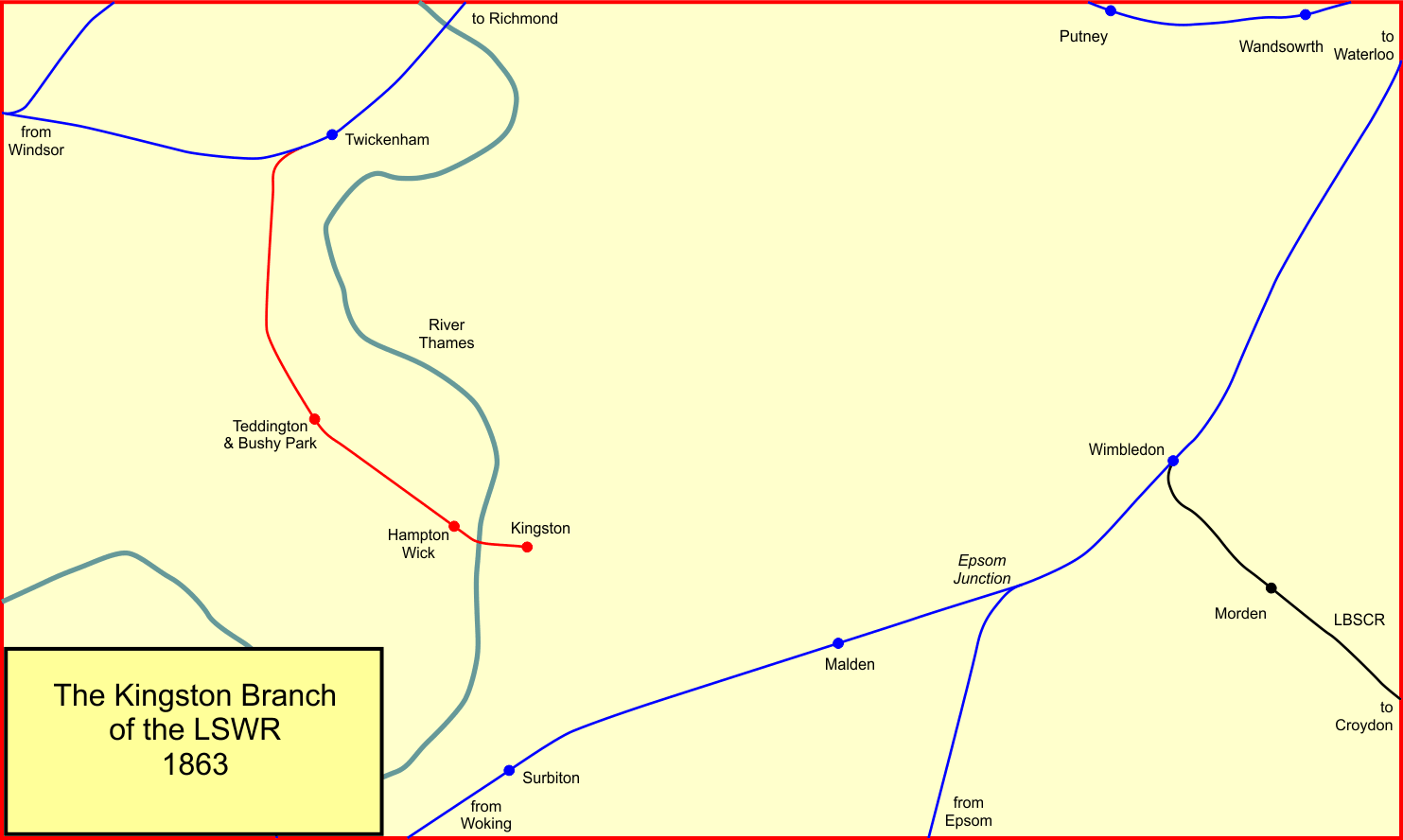
Kingston Loop Railway in 1863

Powers were sought for a branch from Twickenham to near the Middlesex foot of Kingston Bridge in Hampton Wick, avoiding the expense of a bridge across the River Thames. Residents of Kingston wanted the line to extend over the river into their town, and a deputation to the LSWR petitioned for that; the LSWR agreed. The contract went to Thomas Brassey for £48,193, and he constructed the three and a half-mile (6 km) line.

The line opened on 1 July 1863 with stations at Teddington for Bushy Park, Hampton Wick, and the terminus of (New) Kingston. The Kingston station on the main Southampton line was renamed Surbiton & Kingston on the same day.

=== North and South Western Junction Railway ===
The North and South Western Junction Railway had opened on 1 August 1853, connecting Willesden Junction on the London and North Western Railway with Kew. The company was sponsored by the LNWR, the Midland Railway and the North London Railway, and was planned to give access from all those companies to the LSWR lines.

Much of the traffic was inter-company goods movements, but the North London Railway gave access to Fenchurch Street and the City of London for residential travel. The company had been working passenger trains into Richmond and Twickenham, reversing at Kew and Barnes to get there. The LSWR disliked the incursion of alien trains entering its territory, although it gave LSWR passengers access ultimately to Fenchurch Street station, in the City of London, by change of trains.

As part of the works for the Kingston line, the LSWR constructed new curves at Kew and Barnes to enable the N&SWJR trains to run directly, without reversal. Those curves were opened for traffic in readiness, on 1 February 1862, and by running powers already granted, the N&SWJR trains ran through to and to Kingston.

In 1869 a more direct line for the trains from Willesden was opened to Richmond, and the North London Railway passenger trains were transferred to Richmond, where they used a terminal part of the station.

=== LSWR to the City ===
The LSWR had its London terminus at Waterloo. The N&SWJR provided a route to London, but it was very roundabout and usually involved a change of trains. The LSWR found an ally in the London, Chatham and Dover Railway, and the LC&DR had a station at Ludgate Hill. A connection was made from the Windsor and Richmond lines at Clapham Junction (where the station opened on 2 March 1863). The line crossed under the LSWR and London, Brighton and South Coast Railway main lines, making an end-on connection with the LCDR line, which continued past the location of the later Stewarts Lane, and climbed to Factory Junction, where it joined the main line from Victoria. Further east that line served a junction which led north to Loughborough Junction.

This route was brought into use on 1 March 1866, and the LSWR passenger service to Ludgate Hill began on Easter Tuesday 3 April 1866. The first service was from Kingston via Clapham Junction, Brixton, and Loughborough junction. The LSWR had its own booking office at Ludgate Hill, which it maintained until 1890.

=== Kingston to Wimbledon ===
South-Western Railway (Kingston further Extension) Act 1865
- Act of Parliament
- Parliament of the United Kingdom
- Long title: An Act for authorizing the London and South-western Railway Company to make new Lines of Railway in Surrey, and for vesting in them Portions of Railways, and for authorising Agreements between them and other Railway Companies, and for the raising by them of further Monies; and for other Purposes.
- Citation: 28 & 29 Vict. c. cii

Dates
- Royal assent: 19 June 1865

Text of statute as originally enacted

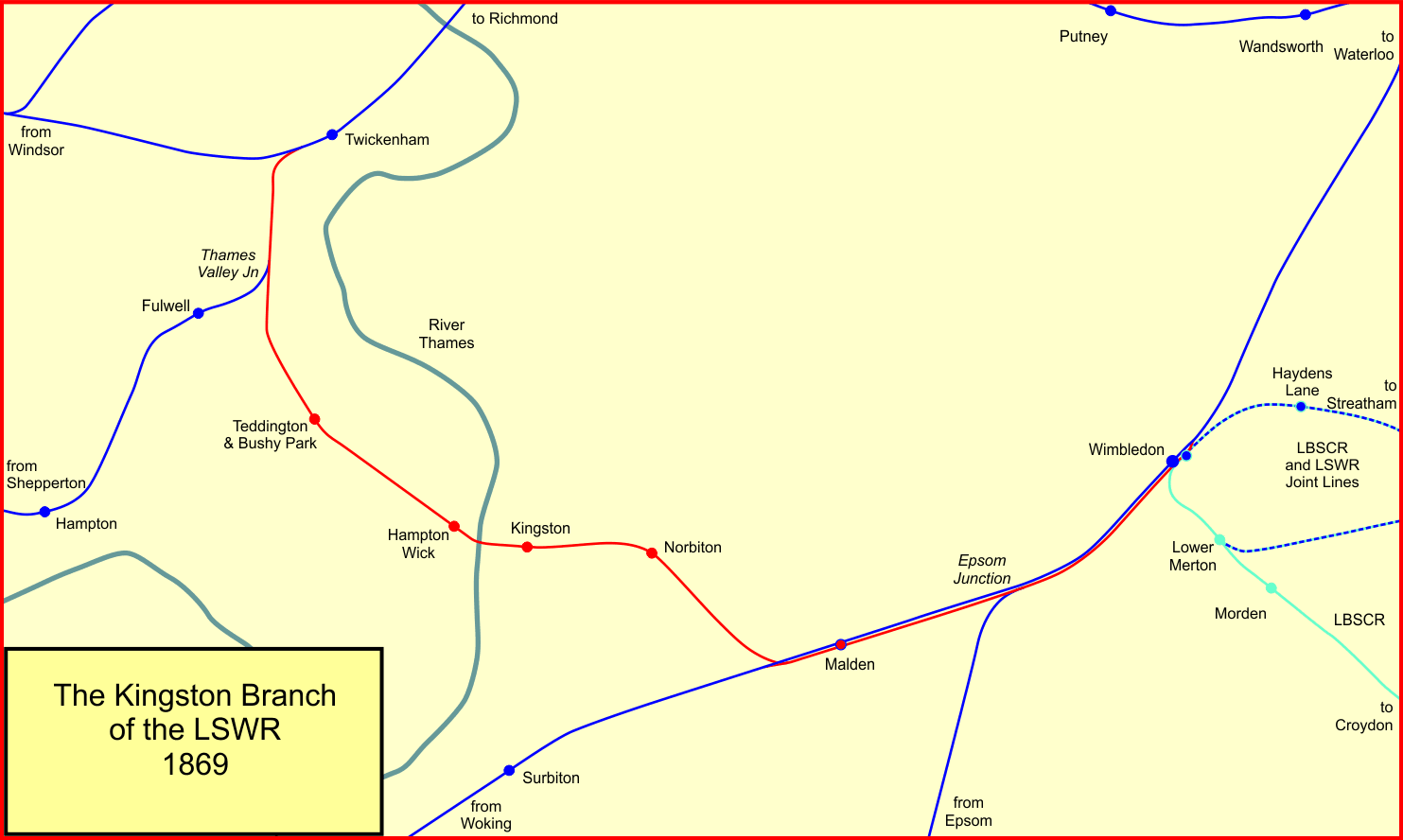
Kingston Loop Railway in 1869

Kingston was at the southern end of a great arc round from Twickenham, and there had been several schemes for more direct connections, to the south-west and to the north-east, and particularly the City of London. All of these had failed, but the LSWR saw the imperative of making some better connection itself. The solution was a Kingston Further Extension Line, authorised by the South-Western Railway (Kingston further Extension) Act 1865 (28 & 29 Vict. c. cii) of 19 June 1865 with supplementary share capital of £120,000. It had agreed with the London, Chatham and Dover Railway on access to Ludgate Hill station, in the city, for its suburban trains.

The line was therefore to continue the Kingston branch through Norbiton, and to burrow under the LSWR main line near the present-day New Malden. The line would then continue independently alongside the main line on its south side, to Wimbledon station. At Wimbledon it would join the Tooting, Merton and Wimbledon Railway, when it opened. That was to be jointly owned between the LSWR and the LBSCR, and to run as far as Streatham Junction. From there the LSWR got running powers over the LBSCR as far as a planned Knights Hill Junction, near the present Tulse Hill station. The LCDR was building a short connecting line from Knights Hill Junction to Herne Hill, which gave access over the LCDR to Ludgate Hill. The running powers also got the LSWR the facility of getting goods trains to and from Deptford Wharf on the LBSCR.

The Tooting, Merton and Wimbledon Railway opened on 1 October 1868, and on 1 January 1869 the Knights Hill Junction to Herne Hill line was ready. On that day the Kingston – Malden – Wimbledon line was opened, and the Kingston to Ludgate Hill passenger service was started on the same day.

The original Kingston station had been a terminus and was unsuitable for dealing with the eastward extension, so a new high level station was built alongside for the purpose; the high level was dictated by the need to cross Richmond Road. A level crossing had been proposed earlier, but it was realised that this was impracticable. Terminating trains at Kingston from Twickenham continued to use the low-level station.

For some time, the Kingston to Ludgate Hill trains used a distinct section of the Wimbledon station, east of Wimbledon Hill Road, while the LBSCR lines and the TM&WR used a location east of the road overbridge. There was no connection at Malden between the Kingston line and the main line. The Wimbledon and Dorking Railway line had opened in 1859 and made a junction with the main line at that time. The location was called Epsom Junction, at the place where Raynes Park station was built in 1871. Now that the Kingston lines were being opened alongside the main line, the Epsom line was altered to make a junction with the Kingston lines instead of the main line. East of Wimbledon, there was a connection into the main line in addition to the Tooting route.

=== Shepperton branch ===
The LSWR opened a branch line to Shepperton on 1 November 1864. The branch had been planned and constructed by the Thames Valley Railway, which was absorbed with the LSWR on by agreement of 21 December 1864. It joined the Kingston branch at Thames Valley Junction, where Strawberry Hill station was later built. As the Malden and Wimbledon connection had not yet been built, the junction led towards Twickenham, and the Shepperton to London passenger train service naturally ran via Richmond.

The Shepperton line became heavily involved with Kempton Park Racecourse, which generated huge volumes of passenger and equine traffic on and around race days, although there was little activity outside those times.

Over time the north facing connection at Strawberry Hill became a nuisance, and the LSWR built a southward curve at the junction, from Fulwell Junction (on the branch) to Shacklegate Junction (towards Kingston). At first this was used for goods trains and race day specials only, but in time, and at the present day, it is the dominant route for London trains.

=== Quadrupling the main line ===
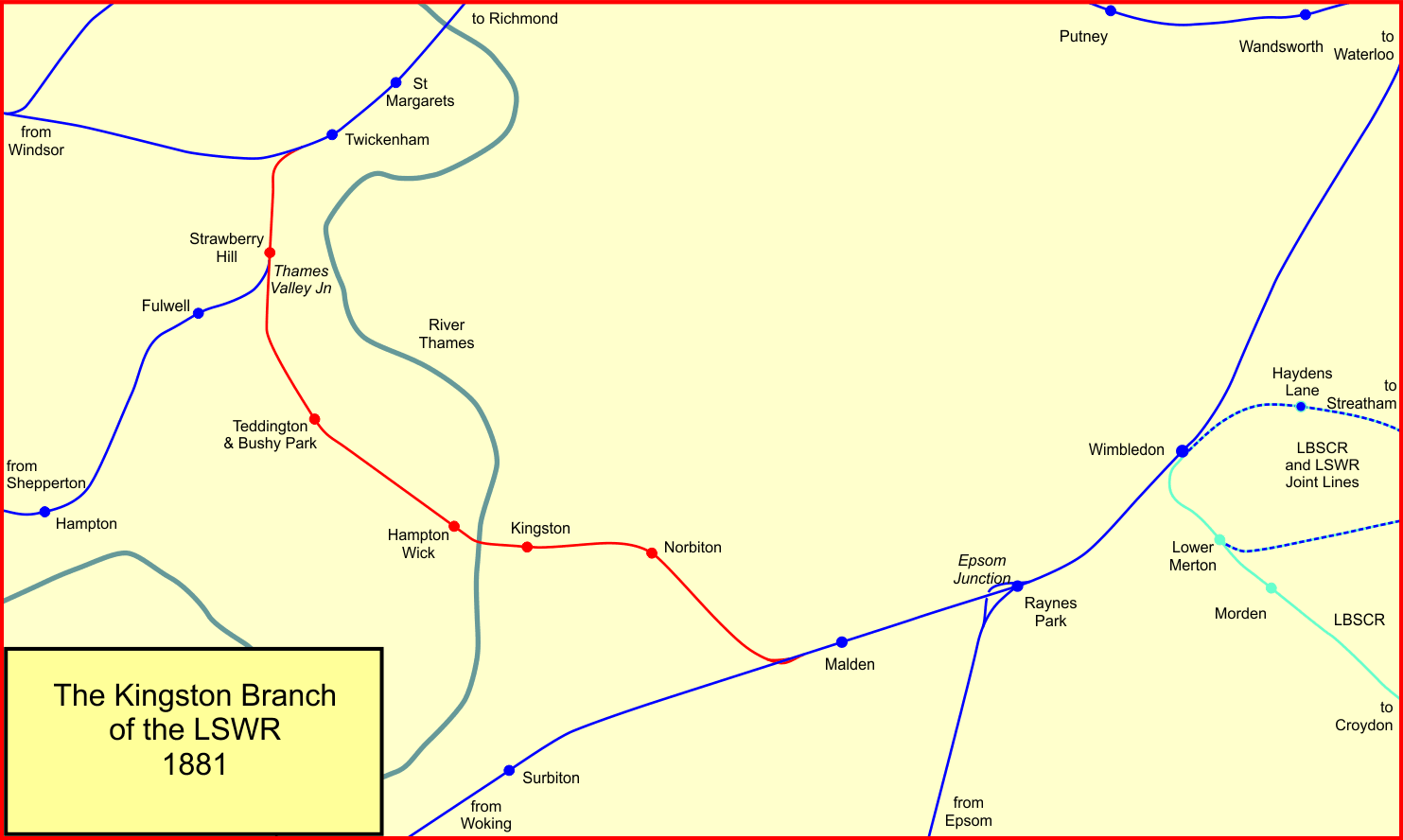
Kingston Loop Railway in 1881

At first there was no connection whatever between the Kingston lines and the main lines alongside, but in April 1880 an interconnection was made at the west end of Coombe and Malden station. In 1881 Wimbledon station was developed into a unified station by the LSWR.

The main line was quadrupled from Malden to Surbiton in 1882: a third track was commissioned on 11 September and the fourth on 1 December. East of Malden the Kingston tracks were incorporated with the main line to form an ordinary quadruple track section; the Local Lines were on the outside. The four tracks. The junction for Kingston was changed; the Up Kingston line directly joined the Up Local Line on the north side of the main line. There is some dispute over the exact date, but it was probably brought into use on Tuesday, 25 March 1884. A few days earlier a diveunder had been created for the Up Epsom line, so that it ran into the up Local Line without interference with the other tracks. This was commissioned on 16 March 1884.

=== Twickenham flyover ===
The original Kingston line left the Richmond to Windsor line by a flat junction at Twickenham. As train frequencies increased, the junction became a source of congestion, and a flyover for the up Kingston line was opened on 22 October 1883. The Up line continued to a new independent platform at the north side of Twickenham station, joining the up Windsor line at the east end.

== Electrification ==
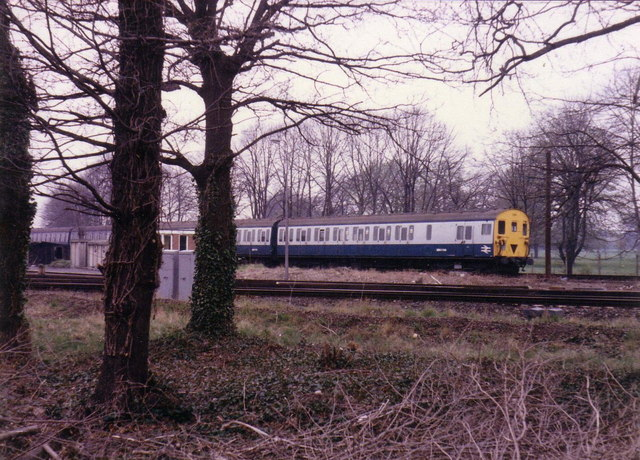
A class 416/2 electric multiple unit train near Strawberry Hill in 1986

In the first decade of the twentieth century, the LSWR was increasingly aware of the competitive disadvantage of its steam operated suburban passenger services, and the decision was taken to electrify certain routes. There was to be a two-stage process, and the Kingston Loop (and the Shepperton branch line) were in stage one. The third rail system at 660 V DC was adopted.

The system was commissioned on Sunday 30 January 1916, and a new timetable was brought in, with acceleration of journey times but above all a very frequent train service. This radically improved the popularity of the LSWR's suburban trains.

Up until this time there had still been a limited service from Kingston to Ludgate Hill, LCDR, for the city. In fact the LCDR had shifted its City service to use Holborn Viaduct station from 1871, and eventually the LSWR trains were the only ones using Ludgate Hill. That came to an end with electrification of the LSWR.

Until 1939 there were a few night trains that were steam hauled. The electric traction was switched off at night, as it was fed by rotary converters which had to be manned. The night steam operation saved the expense of the staffing.

== Early train services ==
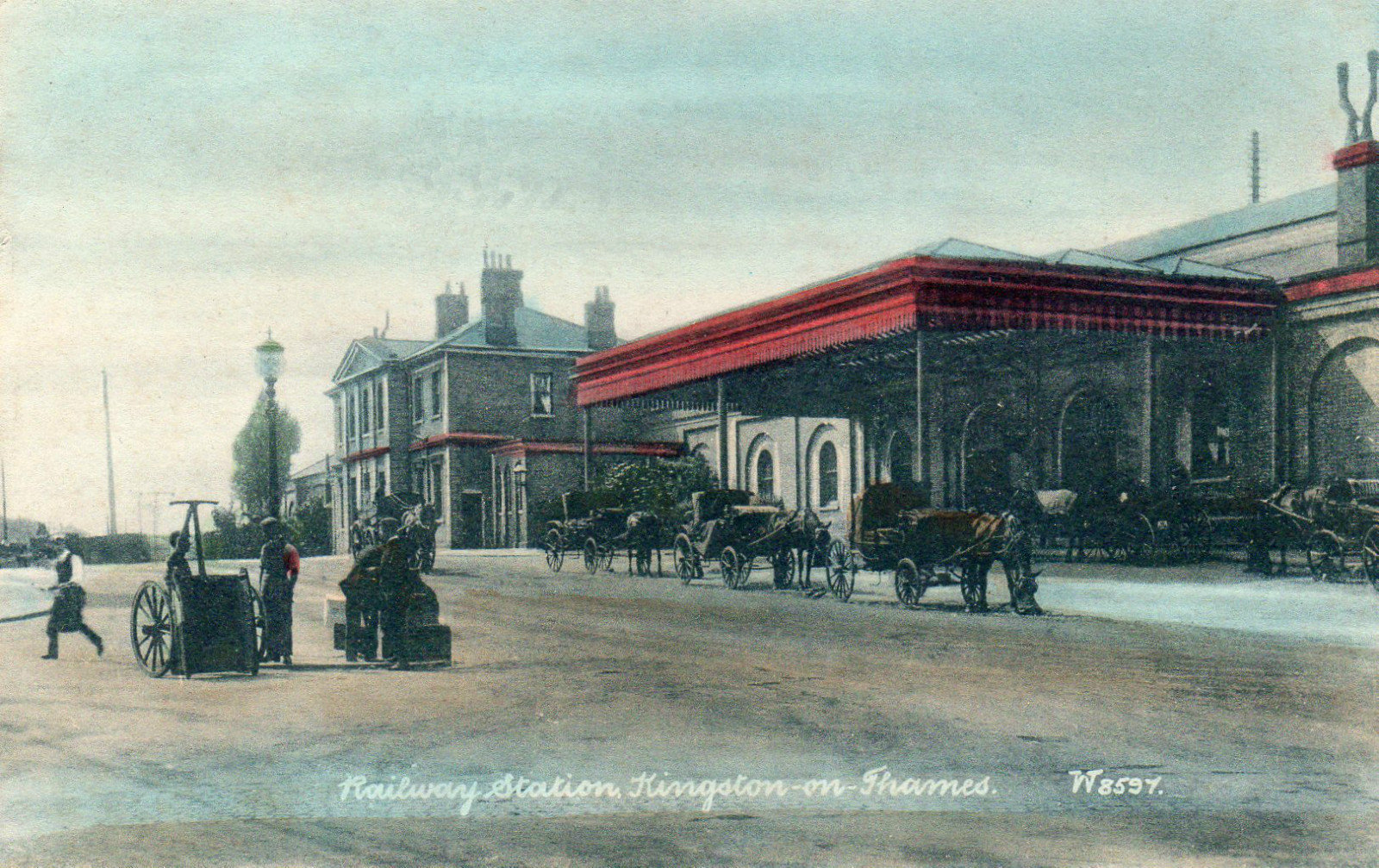
Kingston-on-Thames high level station

When Kingston station first opened in 1863 there were 15 up and 13 down trains on the Twickenham and Waterloo route and nine each way to and from Fenchurch Street, most of them involving a change at Camden Road. About half the trains were composed of LSWR stock, the rest of North London Railway vehicles. LSWR and NLR locomotives were transferred at Kew.

After the opening of the link between Kingston and Malden there were eleven trains daily to Ludgate Hill, passengers for Waterloo changing at Wimbledon and those for Victoria at Herne Hill. Demand for a direct service to Waterloo soon made itself felt; there were only two through trains each way at first but in time a roundabout service (referred to as such in LSWR publicity) was operated, Waterloo to Waterloo via Wimbledon, Kingston and Twickenham. By 1909 there were 39 trains from Waterloo to Kingston via Wimbledon each weekday, with a running time of 37 minutes over the 12 miles off peak, and by omitting some stops, 25 minutes in the peaks. There were by this time only two trains (both in the evening) from Ludgate Hill. At this time there was a daily milk train and six goods workings between Malden and Teddington, serving the intermediate yards. There were two workings from the Midland Railway at Brent; the chief traffic was house coal, and fuel for the gas works near Hampton Wick.

When the line was electrified, there were four trains an hour each way, with an additional two for the Shepperton branch.

In the years 1930 to 1937 there was a series of through excursions from Kingston to Kent Coast resorts on Sundays.

=== Kingston station reconstructed ===
When the high level part of Kingston station was constructed, there was a limited attempt to integrate it with the original terminus, which continued in use. In October 1934 a project to reconstruct the station was approved; it would cost £40,500. All the old street-level buildings were replaced by an imposing red brick entrance and shop block prominently sited at the corner of Richmond Road and Wood Street. Teddington station was also modernised, with £11,700 spent on improvements.

== Present day passenger train service ==
As of April 2026, there is generally a half-hour frequency of trains Waterloo to Waterloo round the Kingston Loop in each direction. In addition there is a half-hourly service Waterloo to Shepperton via Kingston. Some limited enhancements take place in the peaks. A more limited service is given on Sundays, including some terminations at Kingston, running from Waterloo via Hounslow to Twickenham and reversing there.

Since services travel around the loop in both directions from Waterloo, services are advertised using false destinations on departure boards. The clockwise services are initially shown at Waterloo with a destination of Strawberry Hill while the counter-clockwise services have a displayed destination of Teddington. En route they switch again: the clockwise services have an advertised destination of Richmond, then Waterloo via Richmond, then Waterloo, while the counter-clockwise services are advertised as Kingston, then Waterloo via Wimbledon, and finally Waterloo.

== Locations ==
- Twickenham; opened on the Windsor Main Line on 22 August 1848; re-sited 250 yards nearer St Margarets 28 March 1954; still open;
- Strawberry Hill; opened 1 December 1873; still open;
- Thames Valley Junction; later renamed Strawberry Hill Junction;
- Shacklegate Junction;
- Hampton Wick; open 1 July 1863; still open;
- Kingston; opened 1 July 1863 as a terminus; station on through lines opened 1 January 1869 as Kingston New; renamed Kingston 1 April 1896; still open;
- Norbiton; opened 1 January 1869; still open;
- Malden; opened December 1846 (on main line); renamed New Malden and Coombe 1859; renamed Coombe & Malden 1 March 1862; renamed Malden for Coombe 1912; renamed Malden 1955; renamed New Malden 16 September 1957; still open;
- Raynes Park; station on independent Kingston to Wimbledon line util 1881, opened 30 October 1871; still open;
- Wimbledon; separate station for Kingston trains shared with LBSCR and the Tooting, Merton and Wimbledon Railway until combination of Wimbledon stations in 1881.
