= Latchmere Recreation Ground, Kingston upon Thames =

Public park in the Royal Borough of Kingston upon Thames, London

Latchmere Recreation Ground
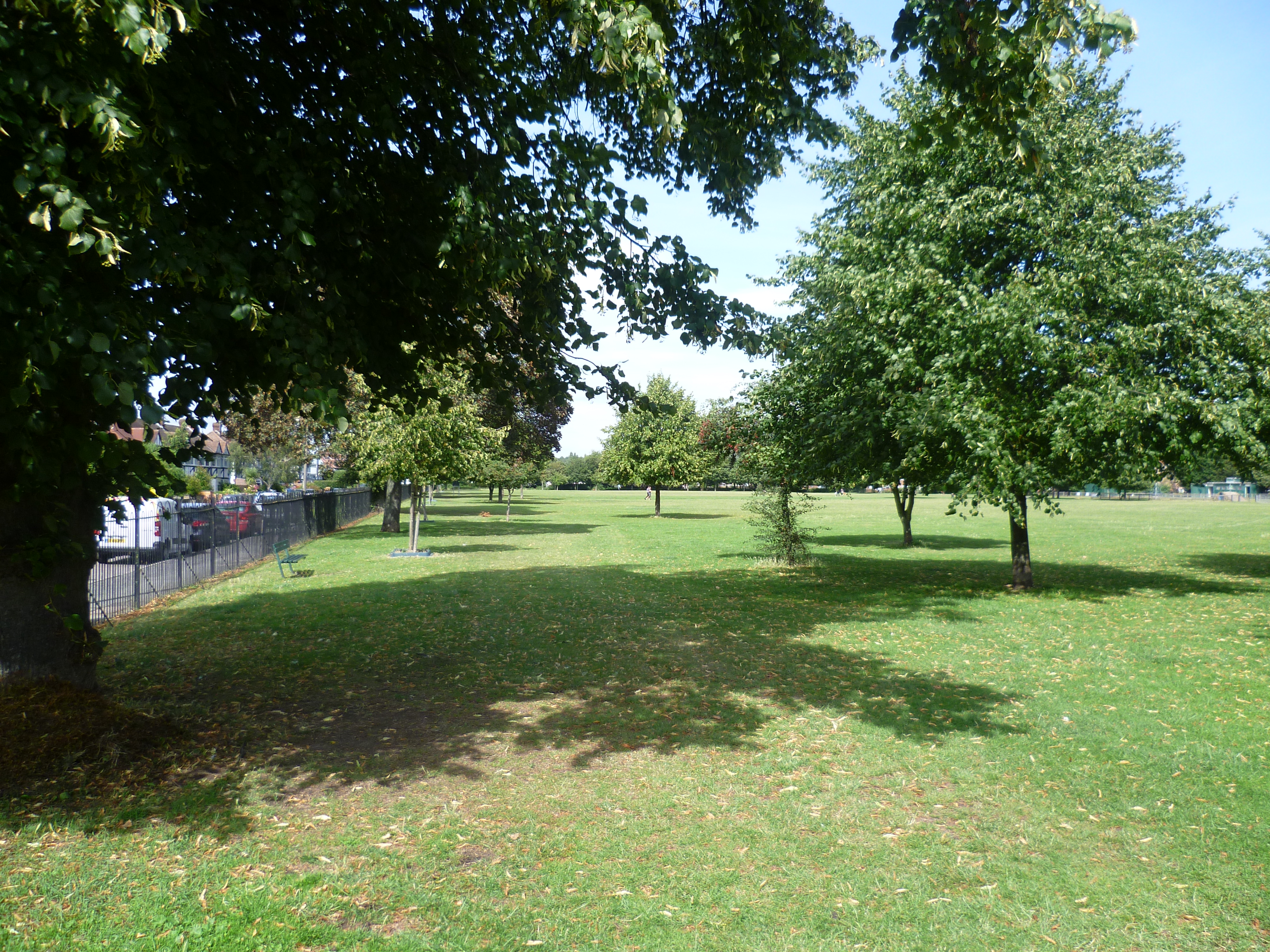
- Latchmere Recreation Ground
- Interactive map of Latchmere Recreation Ground
- Type: Public open space
- Location: Canbury, Kingston upon Thames
- Coordinates: 51.423°N 0.295°W
- Area: 3.6 hectares (8.9 acres)
- Created: 1901
- Operator: Royal Borough of Kingston upon Thames
- Open: All year

Latchmere Recreation Ground is a public open space with playing fields and a children's playground in the north of the Royal Borough of Kingston upon Thames.

== Location ==
Latchmere Recreation Ground is located in the Tudor ward of the Canbury area of Kingston, on flat ground at the bottom of the hill that rises within nearby Richmond Park less than 400m to the east. The River Thames and Canbury Gardens lie approximately half a kilometre to the west and Ham Common a similar distance to the north. It is set in a suburban residential area bounded by Latchmere Road to the south, Latchmere Lane to the west, Aldersbrook Drive to the east and the rear of houses on Tudor Drive to the north.

== Description ==
Latchmere Recreation Ground is a flat, quadrilateral-shaped, area mostly laid out to managed sports field turf. The space is enclosed within a metal fence with the main pedestrian and maintenance vehicle access gates at the south-western corner at the junction of Latchmere Road and Latchmere Lane. Other pedestrian gates are located at the south-east and north-west corners and mid-way along the western side from which a gravel path leads to the south-east corner. Another pedestrian gate provides access from opposite Latchmere Infant School mid-way along the southern side and another from the end of Cranleigh Gardens on the north-east. The traversing footpath and the perimeter are lined with rows of trees which merge with a small wooded area along the northern border. The eastern border was originally defined by the course of the Latchmere Stream, since culverted.

The playing field space is usually laid out to five football pitches overlapped by a central cricket pitch which is less frequently used. A modern children's playground occupies the south east corner opposite Latchmere Primary School and St Agatha's RC Primary School to the south. A small pavilion near to the playground was converted for general community use but was declared unsafe and demolished in 2008. Plans to replace it with a two-storey pavilion were eventually rejected in 2011. The concrete base remains, since occupied by two storage containers. An adjacent brick public toilet block, described as "dilapidated" in 2010, remains and has been partially refurbished.

== History ==
The land formed part of the ancient manor of Kingston-Canbury and, until the mid nineteenth-century, was predominately agricultural. The manor was purchased by the Tollemache family in the early 19th-century, returning ownership to the Earl of Dysart's estate centred around Ham House. The Tollemaches sold much of this area of north Kingston and southern Ham for piecemeal housing development during the late 1800s and made provision for recreation grounds in the area. The field that became Latchmere Recreation Ground was used for cricket and a nearby area south of Latchmere Road on the Richmond Road was an athletics and rugby ground before becoming the home of Kingstonian F.C. between 1919 and 1988. Ownership of the Latchmere Recreation Ground was conveyed by William John Manners Tollemache, 9th Earl of Dysart and the Dysart Trustees on 23 February 1904 to the Municipal Borough of Kingston-upon-Thames, "Kingston Corporation", as part of the settlement of the Richmond, Petersham and Ham Open Spaces Act 1902. The land itself, though, remained within and defined part of the southern boundary of Ham Urban District. The indenture contained covenants constraining the use of the land and preventing unrelated building development:

- "The Corporation shall at all times retain and preserve the said piece of land as a cricket and athletic ground or other place of exercise and recreation for the use of the inhabitants of the said Borough and other persons in conjunction with such inhabitants ..."
- "... the Corporation shall not suffer any building to be erected thereon or on any part thereof except a pavilion or such other building or buildings as may conduce to the more convenient user of the said piece of land as aforesaid ..."

The site was included in 261 acres (106 ha) of southern Ham transferred to the Municipal Borough of Kingston when Ham Urban District was abolished in 1933.

During World War II part of the recreation grounds, as well as nearby Dinton Field, were cultivated for growing vegetables. A high-explosive bomb fell near the site during the Blitz and in 1944 a V-1 flying bomb landed in the recreation ground, damaging nearby Latchmere School.

== Uses ==
Children's football is played regularly on the ground with regular training and matches organised by Kingston Little League Football. A study conducted in 2011 identified a deficit of public playing field facilities in the area close to Kingston town centre, highlighting the relative importance of the site. The adjacent primary schools make use of the field for organised sport and recreation. The ground is used informally by many local residents throughout the year.

== Management ==
The site is currently maintained and managed by Kingston council's outsourced contractor, Idverde via its subsidiary company, Quadrillon Services. A community group, the 'Friends of Latchmere Recreation Ground' (FoLaR), was formed in 2017 to support the use and development of the site. Plans for improving the natural environmental facilities by building a wildlife pond and possibly re-exposing part of the culverted Latchmere Stream have been proposed.
