= Petersham Hole =

The Petersham Hole
- Location within Greater London
- 51.445678°N 0.303154°W
- Location: A307 road, Petersham

The Petersham Hole was a sink hole caused by subsidence of a sewer which forced the total closure of the A307 road in Petersham in the London Borough of Richmond upon Thames in 1979–80. It caused long-term disruption to traffic in the surrounding area and significant direct and indirect costs.

== Collapses ==
The affected area comprised elements of the culverted Sudbrook stream, a minor tributary of the Thames, with a catchment extending south to Kingston, and foul sewer serving much of the Petersham area including four nearby schools. The culvert dated from 1920–22 and the foul sewer from 1890.

An initial collapse occurred in June 1978 in a section of outfall pipe in River Lane (51.446405°N 0.3036°W), off the main A307. The lane is prone to tidal flooding and the outfall is protected by a flap valve. The damage proved to be sufficiently extensive to justify a temporary repair and letting a contract for permanent replacement of a long section.

In February 1979, a further collapse occurred 100 metres upstream to the south, in the busy A307 carriageway. On excavation, an area of cracked pipe was found but, due to heavy rainfall and imminent spring tides, the damaged section was set into rapid-hardening concrete and the hole refilled. Subsequent video inspection indicated the pipework to be in reasonable condition. However, a few weeks later, at the end of March, a further collapse occurred at the same site and a large cavity was found. It was clear that the whole section of sewer had to be replaced, and urgently.

== Impact ==
The hole and subsequent repair work forced a total road closure of the main arterial route between Richmond and Kingston upon Thames. The impact was exacerbated by the narrowness of the road at and near the collapse site. Long diversions resulted via Twickenham to the west or Roehampton to the south-east causing additional congestion. Bus services 65 and 71 were forced to terminate either side of the hole and passengers and crew walk around the site to continue their journeys. To help relieve the transport pressure, exceptionally, nearby Richmond Park remained open to vehicular traffic overnight between Richmond, Ham, and Kingston gates. The park road was widened at Ham Cross near Ham Gate to accommodate temporary traffic lights to facilitate the additional traffic flow. This additional and unusual traffic resulted in the deaths of 84 deer in the park whilst the diversion was in operation.

== Reaction ==
Residents in the immediate area naturally complained at the disruption caused by the repairs and local traders noted a significant loss of trade. The additional displaced traffic also caused complaints. However, despite the predictable negative reactions, others appreciated the tranquillity resulting from the lack of usual traffic. The hole gained significant local notoriety. A local newspaper correspondent reported a sighting, whilst on holiday in Spain, of somebody wearing a T-shirt bearing the slogan "I've seen the Petersham Hole!". The repairs and disruption lasted so long that a party was held around the hole to celebrate its first anniversary on 31 March 1980.

== Repair ==
The repair work involved not just the sewer but also connections into adjoining premises. The 21 inches (530 mm) diameter culvert was replaced by 750 millimetres (30 in) and 900 millimetres (35 in) pipework. The 9 inches (230 mm) and 12 inches (300 mm) diameter foul sewer pipe was replaced with 300 millimetres (12 in) pipe. The opportunity was also taken to lay new water mains. The pipe repairs and replacement in the narrow section of road were completed by 25 May 1980 and, once the covering road works were completed, the road was re-opened on Friday 5 September.

== Costs ==
Local residents directly affected near the site were granted a 20% reduction in their rates. The initial cost of the repair contract was anticipated to be £1,155,000. Total costs of the repairs were subsequently estimated at £2,235,000 and the indirect costs of traffic disruption a further £6,500,000. Wasted man-hours were estimated to have cost £10,000,000.

== Legacy ==
The Petersham Hole has been cited subsequently in the House of Commons and elsewhere as evidence of the damage caused to roads by heavy lorries.

== See also ==
- A307 road
