= Maurice Webb (architect) =

English architect

Maurice Everett Webb (1880–1939) was an English architect of the early 20th century. He started his architectural career by becoming articled to his famous architect father, Sir Aston Webb, in 1902. He later became a partner in the practice trading as Sir Aston Webb and Son. He was the first chairman of the Building Centre in London.

== Projects ==
- alterations to 54 Mount Street, London W1 (c.1919; today residence of Ambassador of Brazil)
- Stock Exchange War Memorial (1919–1921).
- Hertford war memorial (1921)
- Royal Air Force Club, London (1919–1922)
- Wesley House, Jesus Lane, Cambridge (1925–1930)
- Nonconformist chapel (The Sanctuary), Whiteley Village, Surrey (1925–26)
- Artillery House, Artillery Row, London SW1 (1930)
- Thorner's Homes almshouse buildings, Regents Parks Road, Southampton (1932). Designed by Webb, opened in 1932, comprising North Court, Centre Court and South Court. North Court's clocktower building has Listed building status.
- Master's Lodge, Pembroke College, Cambridge (1932–1933; demolished in 1990s)
- Abbey Flats, Abbey Road, London NW8
- The Guildhall, Kingston upon Thames, Surrey (1935)
- Bentalls department store, Kingston upon Thames (1935)
- The Grampians, residential apartment block, Shepherds Bush, London W6 (1935 – 1937)
- The Presidential Palace, Nicosia, Cyprus (1933–1937)
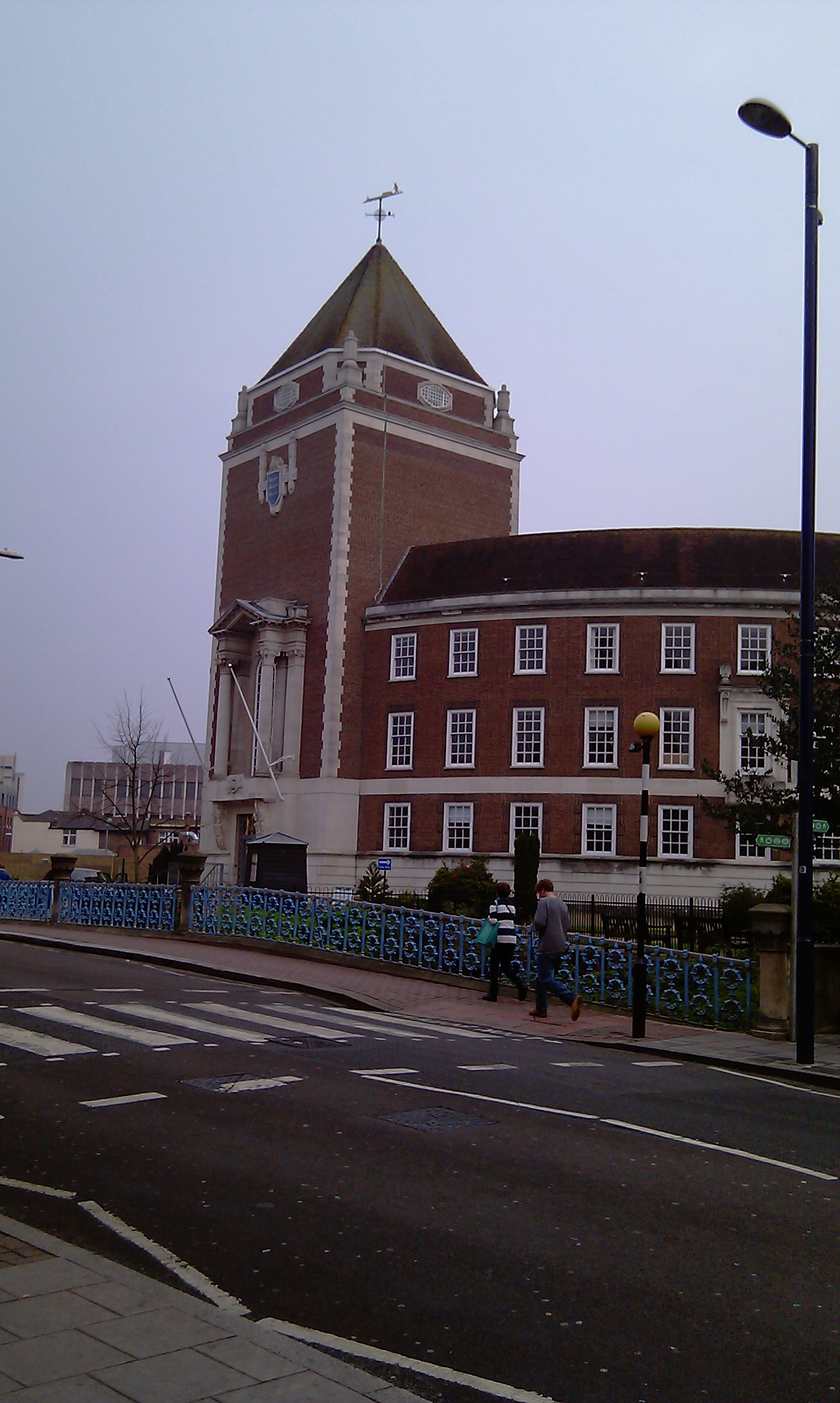
Kingston Guildhall, Kingston upon Thames Surrey.

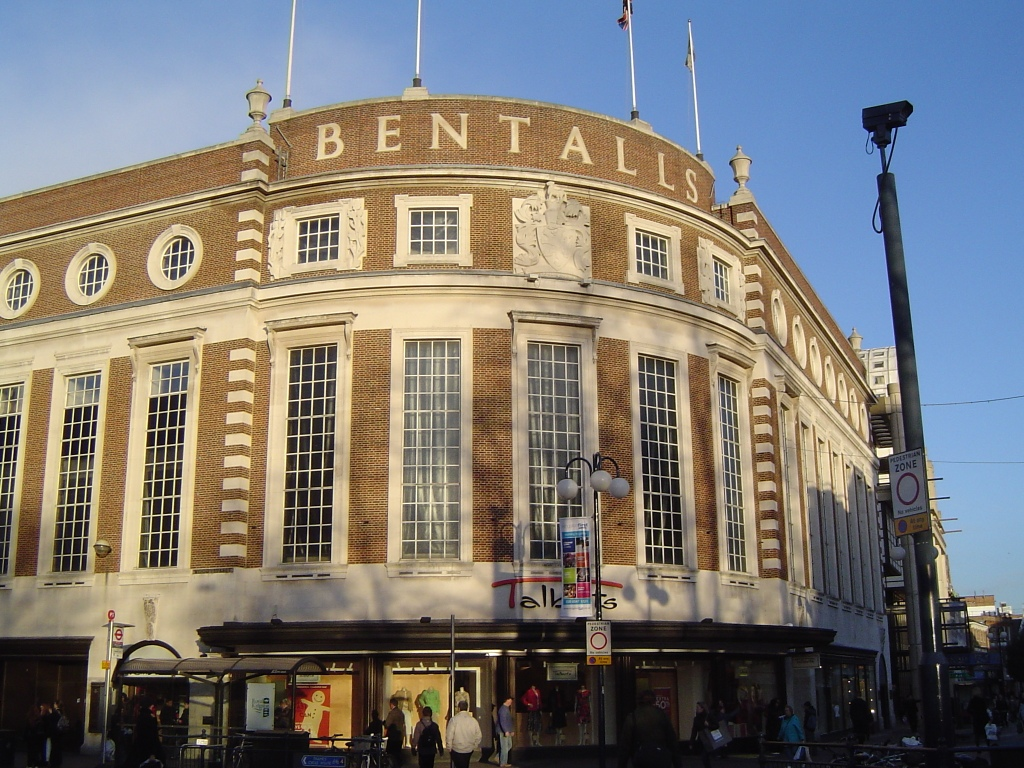
Bentalls Department Store, Kingston upon Thames Surrey.

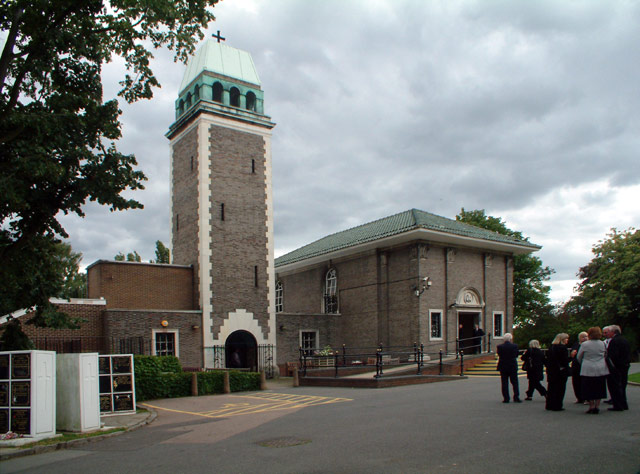
Honor Oak Crematorium, Camberwell New Cemetery, London

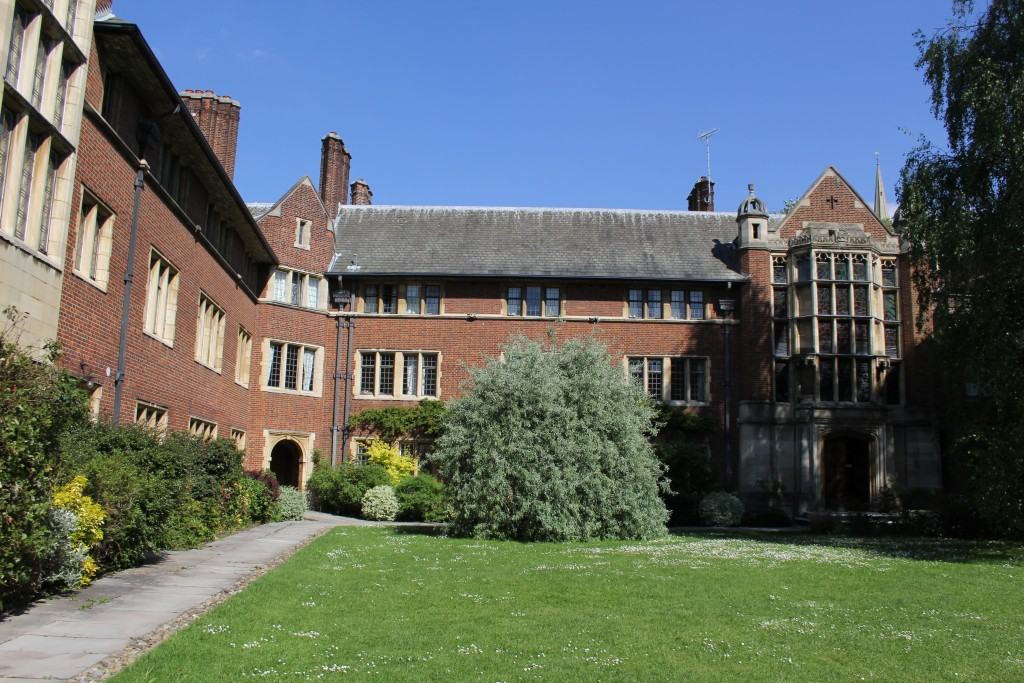
Wesley House, Cambridge

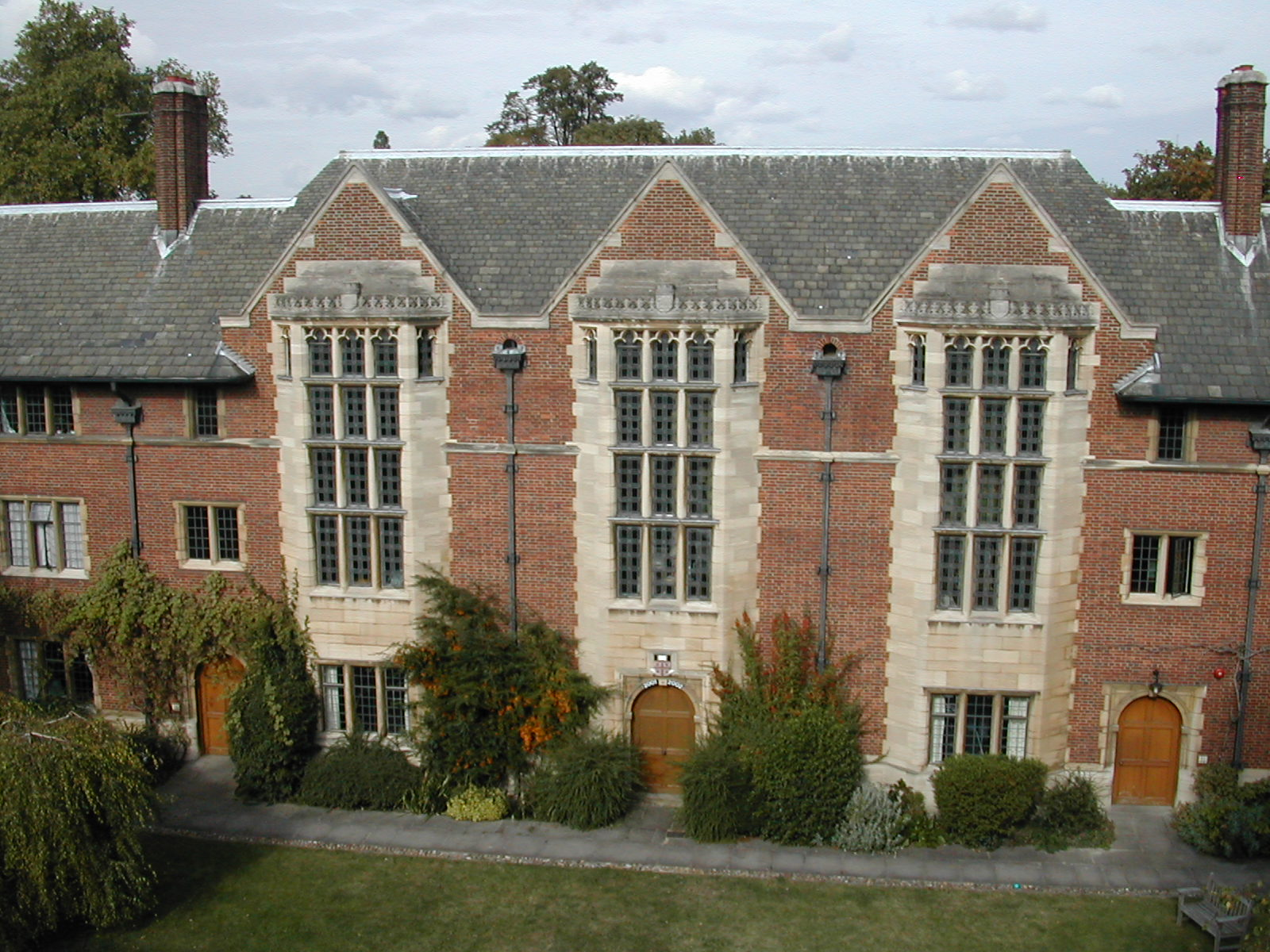
The Webb Library, Jesus College, Cambridge (originally part of Wesley House)

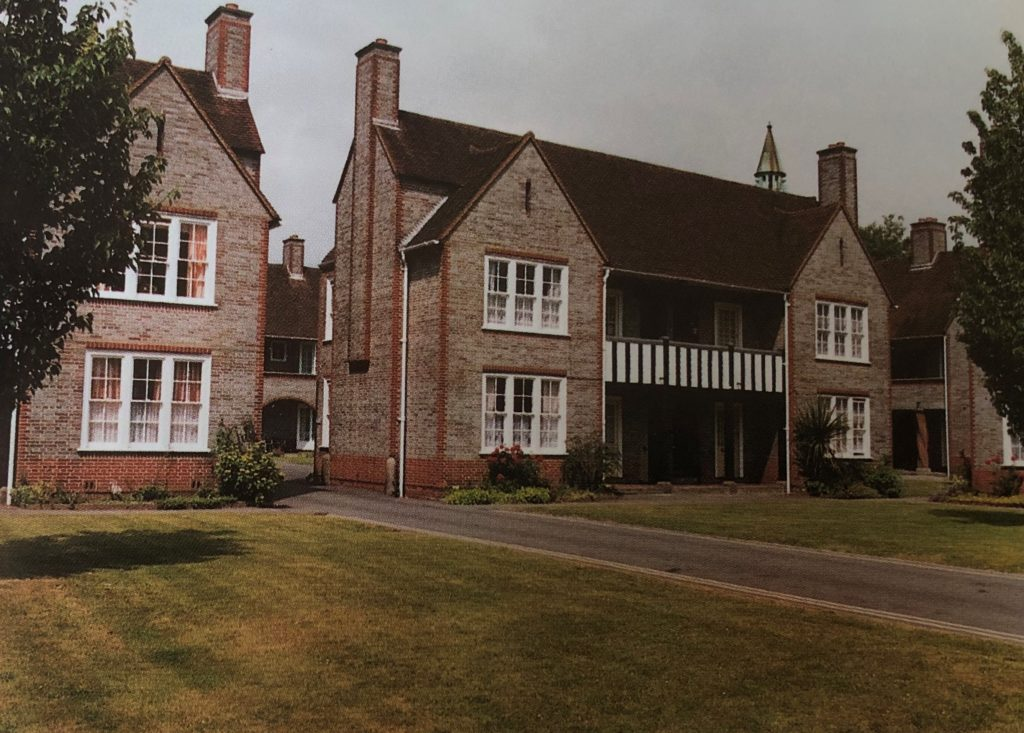
Thorner's Homes (almshouses), Regents Park Road, Southampton

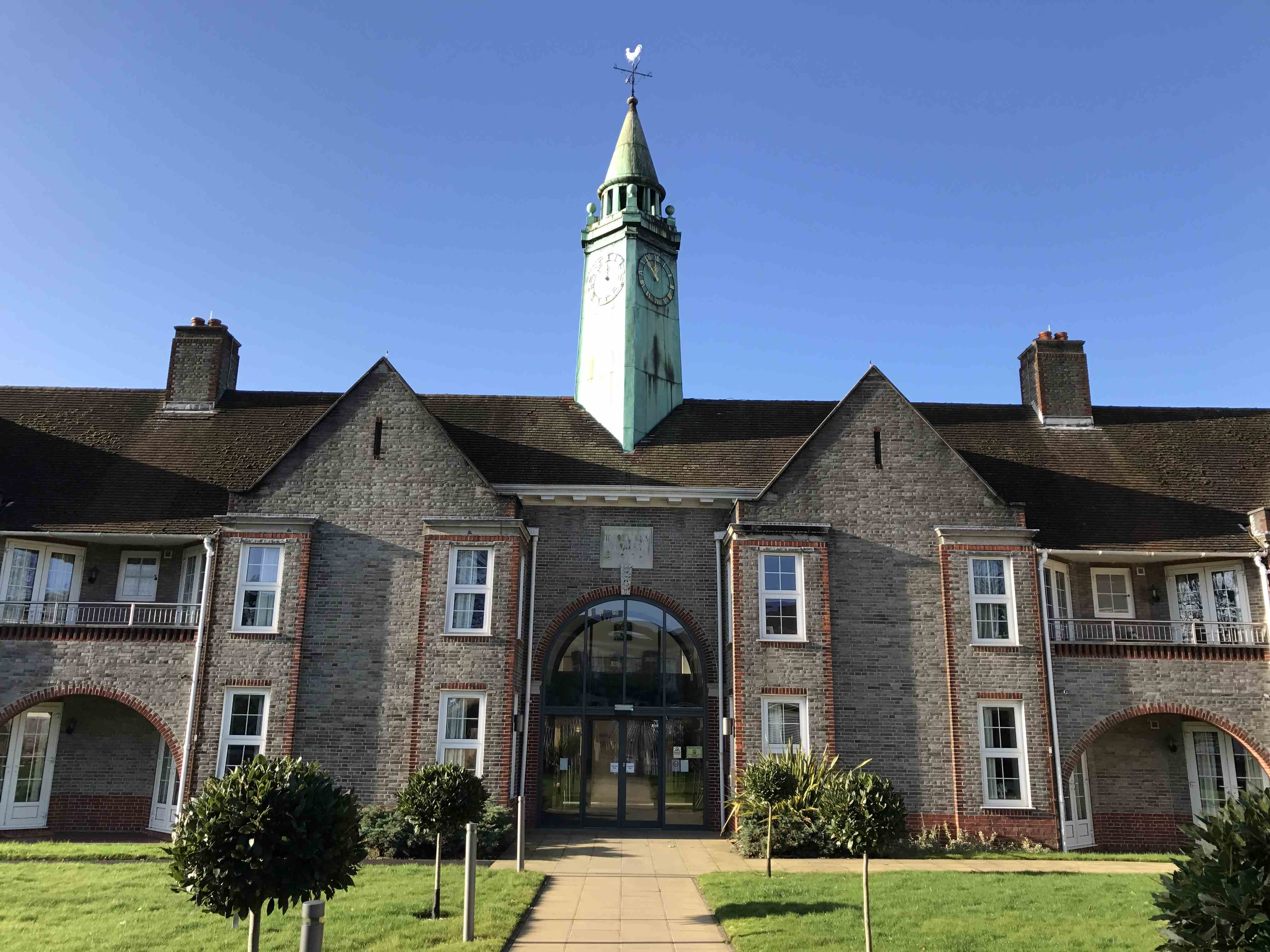
North Court clocktower building, Thorner's Homes
