= Kingston upon Thames Guildhall =

Municipal building in London, England

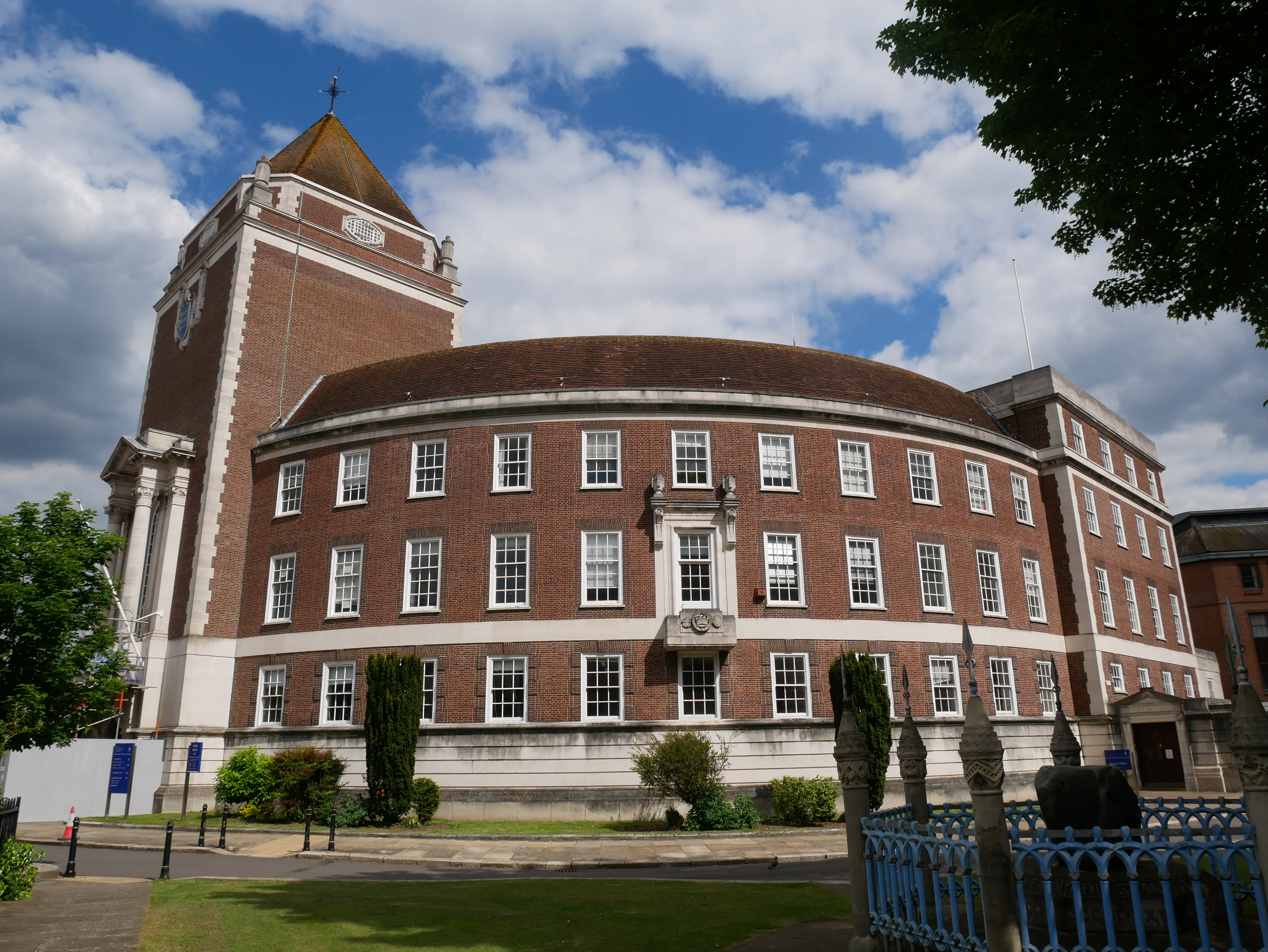
- The Guildhall in 2021

- Shown in Kingston upon Thames
- 51.40850°N 0.30618°W
- Location: Kingston upon Thames

History
- Built: 1935

Site notes
- Architect: Maurice Webb
- Architectural style: Neo-Georgian style

Listed Building – Grade II
- Designated: 6 October 1983
- Reference no.: 1080065

The Kingston upon Thames Guildhall is a municipal building in Kingston upon Thames in England. It is situated in the High Street, adjacent to the Hogsmill River. The guildhall, which is the headquarters of Kingston upon Thames London Borough Council, is a Grade II listed building.

== History ==
In the early 20th century the local council was based at municipal offices in "Clattern House", a mansion which had originally been built as judges' lodgings in 1811. The Coronation Stone, which commemorates the coronation of seven Anglo-Saxon kings, was moved to its present location, which was just in front of the old mansion, in 1850. After the old municipal offices became inadequate, they were demolished to make way for the current building.

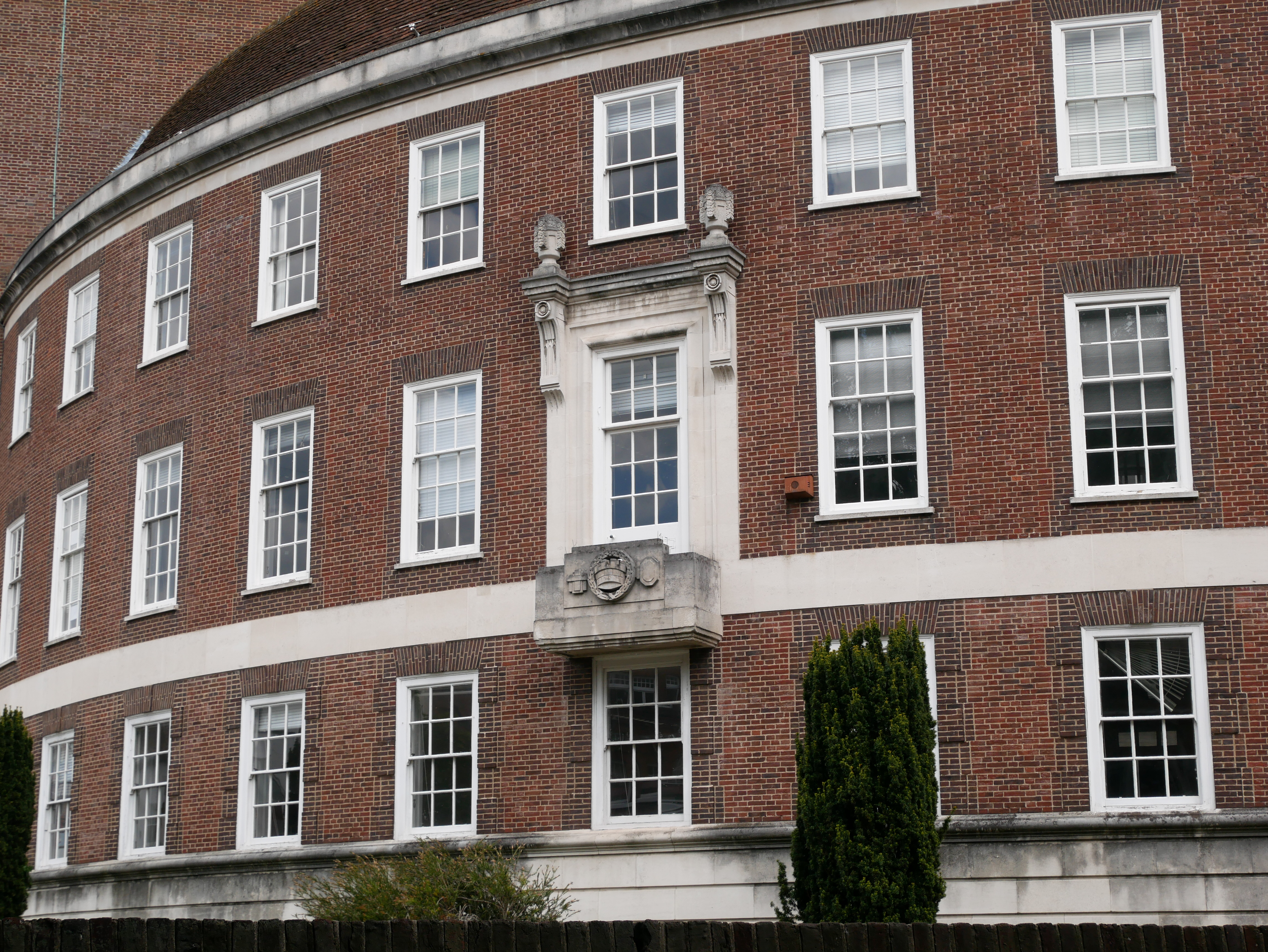
Detail on the exterior of the Guildhall

The current building, which was designed by Maurice Webb in the Neo-Georgian style, was built at a cost of £130,000. It was officially opened by Princess Alice, Countess of Athlone on 3 July 1935.

It is a neo-Georgian red brick building with Portland stone dressings and tiled roof, laid out to a semi-circular plan. To the centre of the semi-circular elevation is a massive square tower with a low octagonal spire and fluted corner pinnacles. The central entrance is in the base of the tower. Above it is a two-storey, round headed window set in an open pedimented stone niche with simplified Corinthian columns rising from a corbelled balcony. Pictorial references to the River Thames are displayed upon a keystone inside the niche, and on the corbels, capitals and iron gates. The coat of arms of Kingston is set further up the tower. Inside, there is a marble lined circular entrance hall, and a central staircase with original opaque glass semi-spherical lamps.

The building, which was established as the headquarters of the Municipal Borough of Kingston-upon-Thames, became the administrative headquarters of the enlarged Kingston upon Thames London Borough Council in 1965. In order to accommodate a larger number of staff, it was extended in 1968. It was further extended by additions known as "Guildhall one" and Guildhall two", which were designed by Ronald Ward & Partners, between 1975 and 1978.

The part of the complex associated with the magistrates' courts closed in 2011 and re-opened as a venue for weddings and civil partnership ceremonies known as the "Old Court House" in September 2015.

== Gallery ==
Video of the Guildhall in Kingston upon Thames

== See also ==
- Guild
- Guildhall
