= The Grampians, Shepherd's Bush =

Block of flats in Shepherd's Bush, London, England

Coordinates: 51.5026°N 0.2222°W

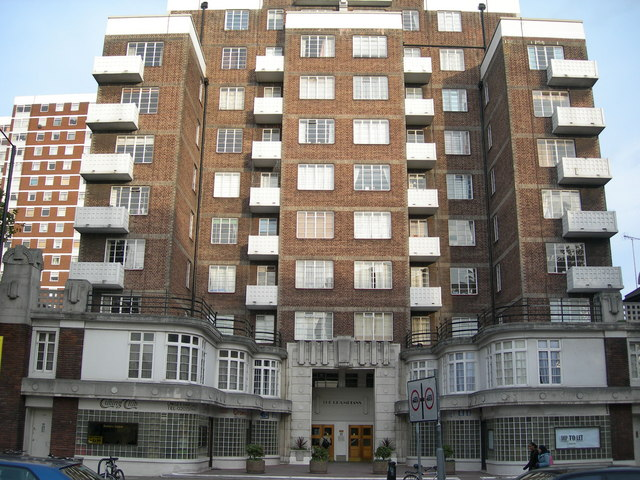
The Grampians

The Grampians is a grade II listed apartment building (a building of special interest) in Hammersmith, London. It was designed by Maurice Webb in the Art Deco style and built between 1935 and 1937 on top of the former route of the Kensington to Richmond LSWR line and opposite of the LSWR Shepherd's Bush station which also had a tower block built on top of its site in the mid 1950s. The designs for the block were exhibited at the Royal Academy in 1935.
