= Royal Air Force Club =

Officer's club in London

Coordinates: 51.5041°N 0.1485°W

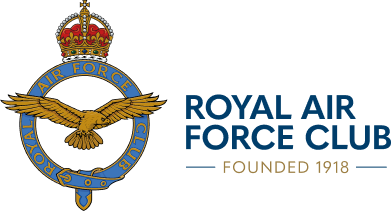

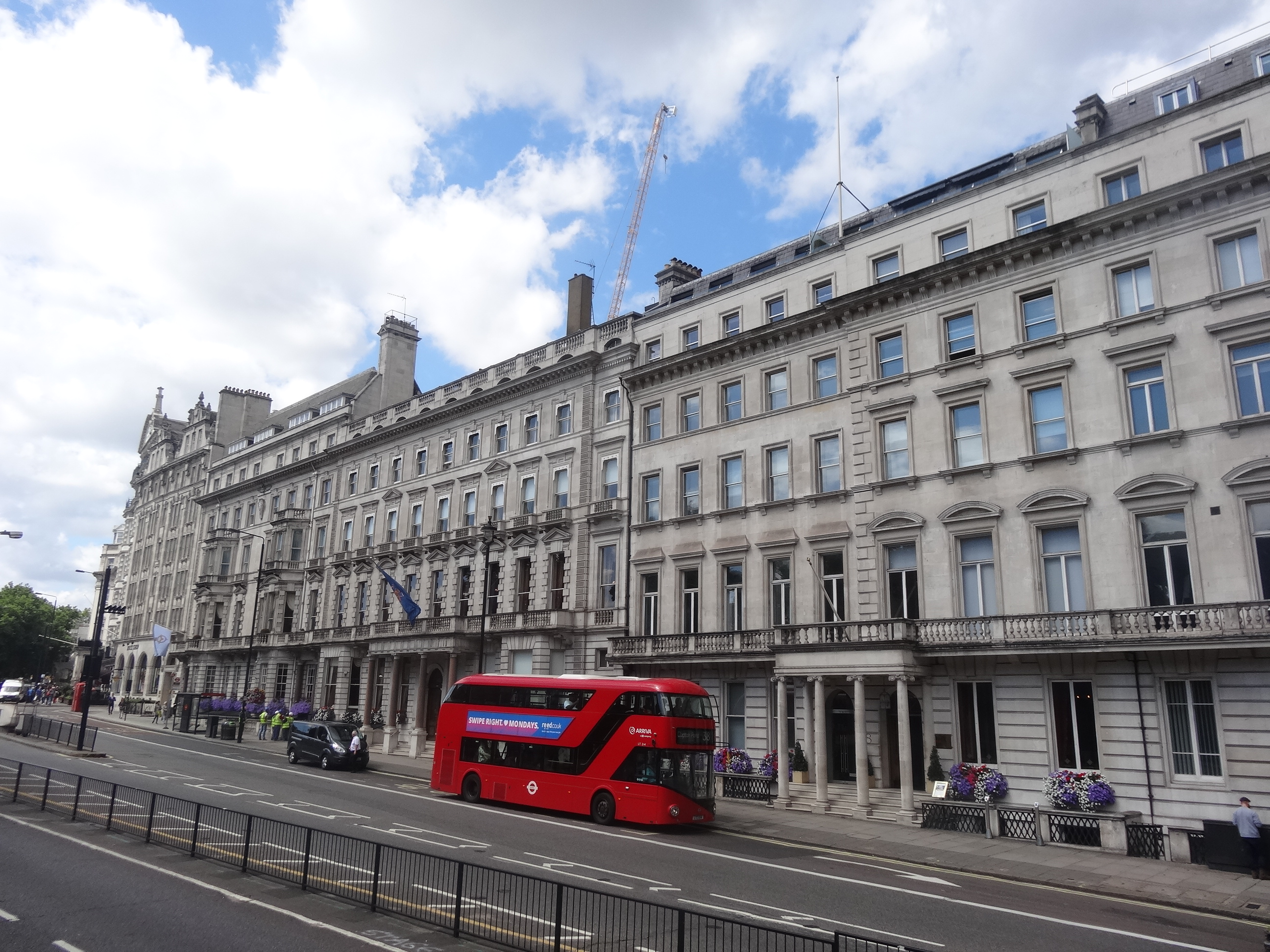
- 118-128 Piccadilly
- Formation: 1918
- Headquarters: RAF Clubhouse
- Location: 128 Piccadilly, London, United Kingdom
- Members: Air Force Officers
- Website: rafclub.org.uk

The Royal Air Force Club, or RAF Club in short-form, is a private members' club located at 128 Piccadilly, London. Membership is open to those who hold, or have held, commissions in the RAF, PMRAFNS, Reserve Forces and Commonwealth and friendly foreign air forces, Members of the British Army and Royal Navy who are serving on secondment with the RAF are also eligible for membership.

The Chair of the Board of Trustees is The Hon. Air Vice-Marshal Warren 'Bunny' James (rtd) who was appointed in July 2025, taking over from Air Vice-Marshal David Murray.

== History ==
The Royal Flying Corps Club, the forerunner of the Royal Air Force Club, opened at 13 Bruton Street in 1917. It became the Royal Air Force Club in 1918, shortly after the first Lord Cowdray donated funds to obtain a permanent building which would house the Club. The buildings, still in use today, were acquired by the middle of 1919 (the Piccadilly frontage was originally the Ladies Lyceum Club, while the rear half, facing Old Park Lane, was stables). Between 1919 and 1921, extensive reconstruction took place, supervised by architect Maurice Webb and largely financed by Lord Cowdray. On 2 January 1922 the Club was fully opened to Members, although it was not officially opened by the Duke of York until 24 February 1922. On 14 March 1922 the Club was visited by King George V and Queen Mary. This association with the Royal Family continues to this day; Queen Elizabeth II was the Club's Patron from 1952–2022. Following the death of Queen Elizabeth II, Marshal of the Royal Air Force, His Majesty King Charles III became Patron of the Club.

As of 2017, a year's membership subscription costs half of one day's wages for serving (from £42.50), or former serving (retired) RAF officers (£155.00). For non-RAF personnel, affiliate membership starts at £170 plus joining fee. Non-RAF personnel who are eligible to apply for membership include those in the aerospace industry who are Fellows of the Royal Aeronautical Society (FRAeS).

== Bibliography ==
- Henry Probert & Michael Gilbert, 128: The Story of the Royal Air Force Club, Royal Air Force Club, 2004. ISBN 0-9547849-0-1
- Lee, Celia (2015). HRH The Duke of Kent: A Life of Service. London: Seymour Books. ISBN 978-1-84396-351-6.
- Thévoz, Seth Alexander (2022). Behind Closed Doors: The Secret Life of London Private Members' Clubs. London: Robinson/Little, Brown. ISBN 978-1-47214-646-5.
- Thévoz, Seth Alexander (2025). London Clubland: A Companion for the Curious. London: Robinson/Little, Brown. ISBN 978-1472149985.
