= London Buses route 65 =

London bus route

65
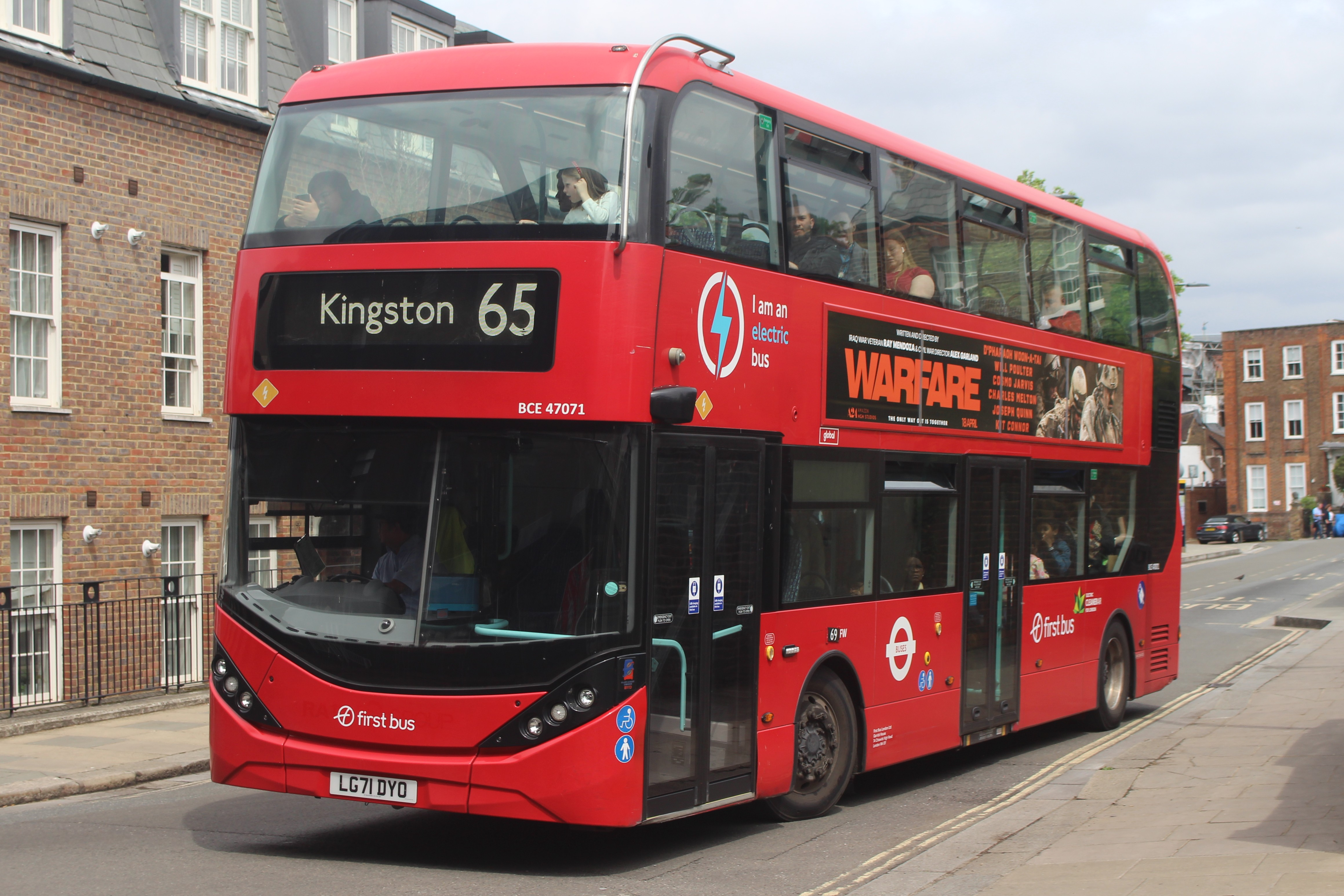
- London United BYD Alexander Dennis Enviro400EV at Richmond bus station in May 2025

Overview
- Operator: London United (First Bus London)
- Garage: Fulwell
- Vehicle: BYD Alexander Dennis Enviro400EV
- Night-time: N65

Route
- Start: Ealing Broadway station
- Via: Brentford; Kew; Richmond; Petersham; Ham
- End: Kingston upon Thames

London Buses route 65 is a Transport for London contracted bus route in London, England. Running between Ealing Broadway station and Kingston upon Thames, it is operated by First Bus London subsidiary London United.

== History ==
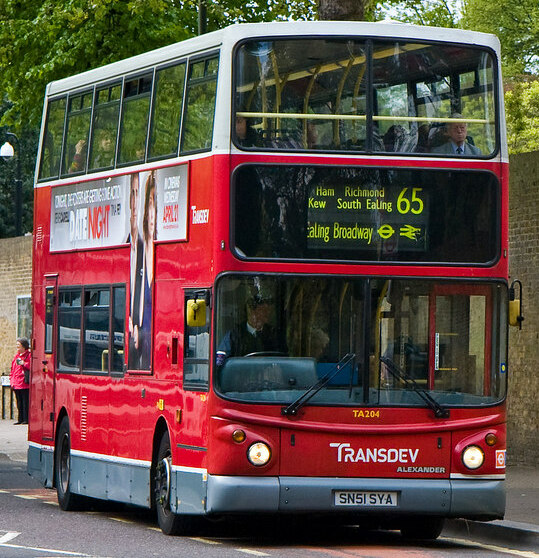
Transdev London Alexander ALX400 bodied Dennis Trident 2 in Kew in May 2010

Route 65 originally ran from Ealing Argyle Road (now Scotch Common) to Leatherhead via Ealing Broadway, South Ealing, Brentford, Richmond, Petersham, Ham, Kingston, Tolworth, Hook and Chessington. In the summer months, the route was extended from Kingston to Chessington Zoo. It was initially operated from Kingston (K) and Turnham Green (V) garages, using STL-class AEC Regents and, after World War II, AEC Regent III RTs, Leyland Titans, and Routemasters. In 1946, "pay-as-you-enter" experiments were carried out on route 65, running between Ealing Broadway and Leatherhead.

In the 1960s, the southernmost section between Chessington Zoo and Leatherhead was withdrawn and replaced by route 71. In 1975, the elderly AEC Regent III RTs were replaced by AEC Routemasters, and the route extended from Chessington Zoo to Chessington Fox & Hounds during Monday to Friday peak hours.

In February 1979, the route was temporarily split in two in Petersham, due to a large sinkhole nicknamed the 'Petersham Hole'. Regular through service did not resume until September 1980.

In 1984, the northern section to Argyle Road was cut back to Ealing Broadway. In 1985, the 65 was converted to one-person operation using MCW Metrobuses, all based at Norbiton. In 1987, the route was reduced further, with the southern portion of the route to Chessington cut back to Kingston. By this time, route tendering had been established in London, and 65 passed to Kingston Bus, a low-cost unit established by London Buses.

Upon being re-tendered, the route was awarded to Armchair Passenger Transport. However a delay in the delivery of new buses resulted in London & Country operating it for a few months from 29 September 1990, mainly using Leyland Atlanteans from distant Croydon and Leatherhead garages.

Armchair finally took over in January 1991, using a batch of seventeen Leyland Olympians plus three second-hand Atlanteans. It retained the route upon it being re-tendered in 1996, and subsequently replaced the ageing Atlanteans with new Northern Counties Palatine II bodied Volvo Olympians. A variety of other buses worked the route during Armchair's tenure, including Alexander bodied Leyland Olympians after Armchair lost route 260, and two MCW Metrobuses new to East Kent Road Car Company.

Upon being re-tendered, the route passed to London United on 29 June 2002 with new Alexander ALX400 bodied Dennis Trident 2s from Fulwell garage.

Upon being re-tendered, it was retained by London United with a new contract commencing on 4 July 2009, that saw the section between Kingston and Chessington reinstated for night-time services only. London United retained the route when next tendered with the new contract to commence on 2 July 2016.

In 2022, the bus fleet was electrified, with the introduction of BYD Alexander Dennis Enviro400EV battery electric buses.

On 28 February 2025, the route passed from London United to First Bus London following the acquisition of RATP Dev Transit London by FirstGroup.

== Current route ==
Route 65 operates via these primary locations:

- Ealing Broadway station
- South Ealing station
- Brentford High Street
- Kew Bridge station
- Kew Gardens for Kew Gardens station
- Richmond station
- Richmond bus station
- Sandy Lane
- Ham
- Kingston station
- Cromwell Road bus station
- Kingston upon Thames Brook Street
