= Little League Football =

British children's sport charity

Little League Football is a UK charity that promotes free-of-charge association football to children through a network of local little leagues, acting as an 'umbrella' organisation. Founded in 1968 by Frank Adey in Morden, the initial league comprised 6 teams. Little League Football now operates 16 leagues in Surrey, London and Birmingham serving over 5000 children.

== History ==
Frank Adey, a former player for Epsom Town F.C., was also a baseball enthusiast. Following visits to the USA he was inspired by the Little League Baseball concept of free-of-charge children's sport in teams chosen to balance ability and encourage participation and he decided to apply the principles to children's football. Rules were modified to make the game more child-centric, notably reducing the size of pitches and enforcing substitutions. The principle of not charging for participation has encouraged a community-based structure but raising adequate funds to maintain operation can be a challenge.

== Rules, Laws and affiliation ==
Although Little League has its own rules, it still adheres to the FIFA Laws of the Game, enforced by FA qualified referees. Individual local leagues may optionally affiliate to their local county FA.
