= Municipal Borough of Kingston-upon-Thames =

Former local government area in the UK

Coordinates: 51.4103°N 0.2994°W

Kingston-upon-Thames
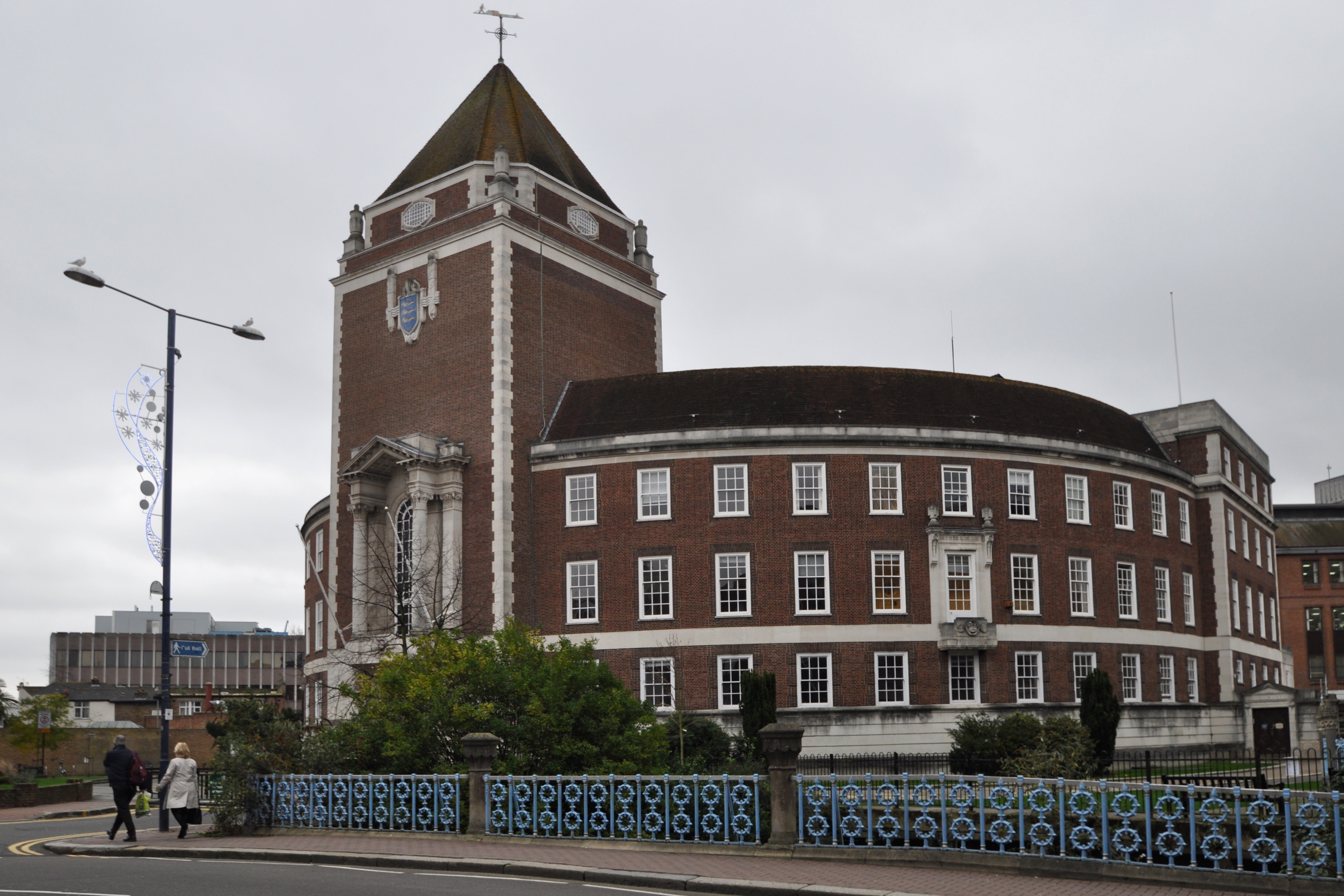
- Kingston upon Thames Guildhall
- Interactive map of Kingston-upon-Thames
- Area
  - 1911: 1,133 acres (4.6 km^{2})
  - 1931: 1,131 acres (4.6 km^{2})
  - 1961: 1,408 acres (5.7 km^{2})
- Population
  - 1911: 37,975
  - 1931: 39,055
  - 1961: 36,461
- Density
  - 1911: 33/acre
  - 1931: 34/acre
  - 1961: 26/acre
- History
  - Origin: Kingston-upon-Thames ancient borough
  - Created: 1835
  - Abolished: 1965
  - Succeeded by: London Borough of Kingston upon Thames
- Status: Municipal borough (1835—1965); Royal borough (confirmed 1927); Civil parish (1894—1965)
- Government: Kingston Corporation
  - HQ: Market House (1840–1935); Guildhall (1935–1965)
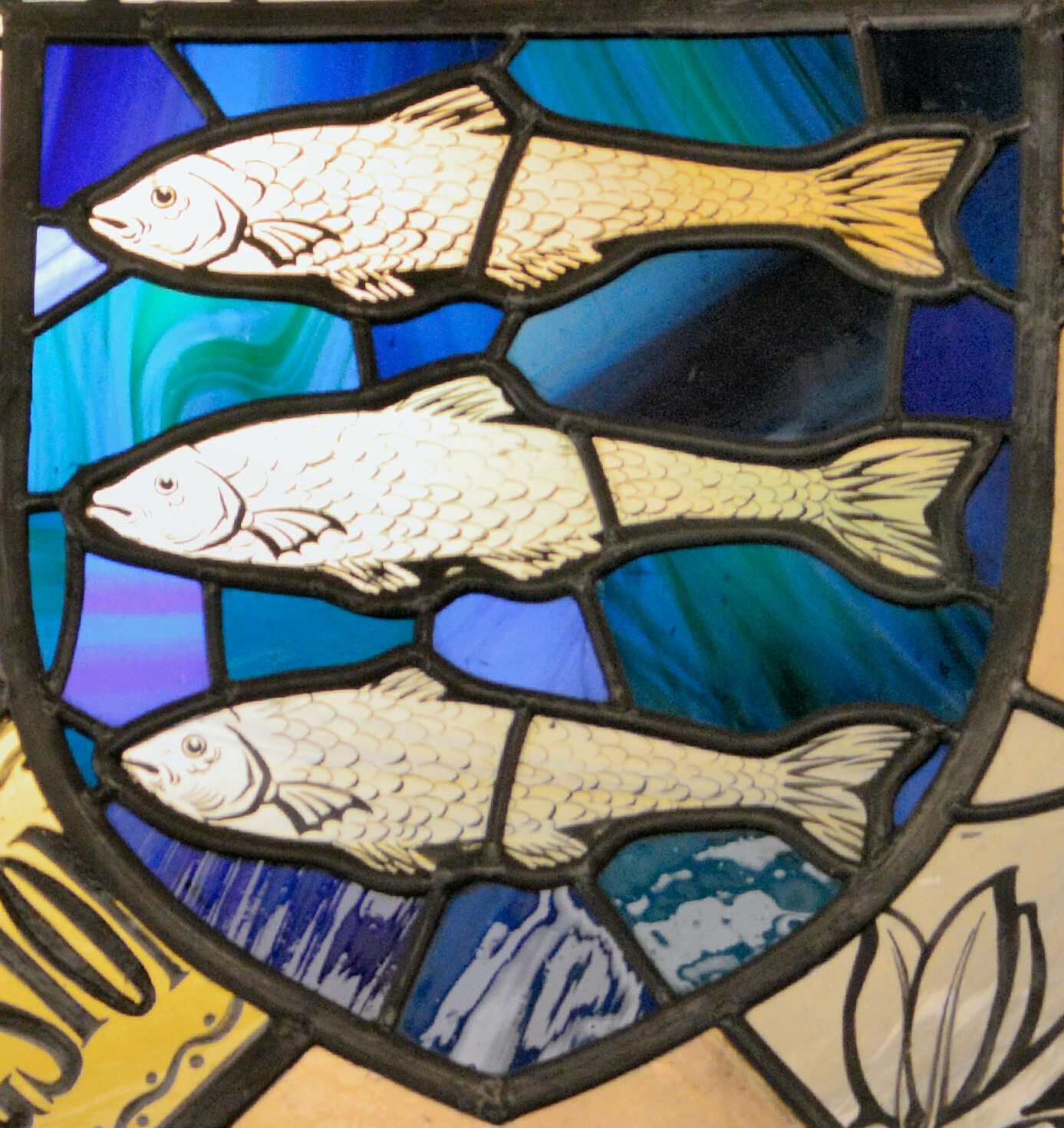
- Stained-glass emblazonment of Coat of Arms

Kingston-upon-Thames (spelt with hyphens) was a local government district in north east Surrey, England from 1835 to 1965 around the town now known as Kingston upon Thames. It was alternatively known as Kingston on Thames (spelt with or without hyphens). It was a municipal borough and also held the rarer status of Royal borough. The district was abolished in 1965 and was replaced with the larger London Borough of Kingston upon Thames in Greater London, with the Royal borough status passed to the new district.

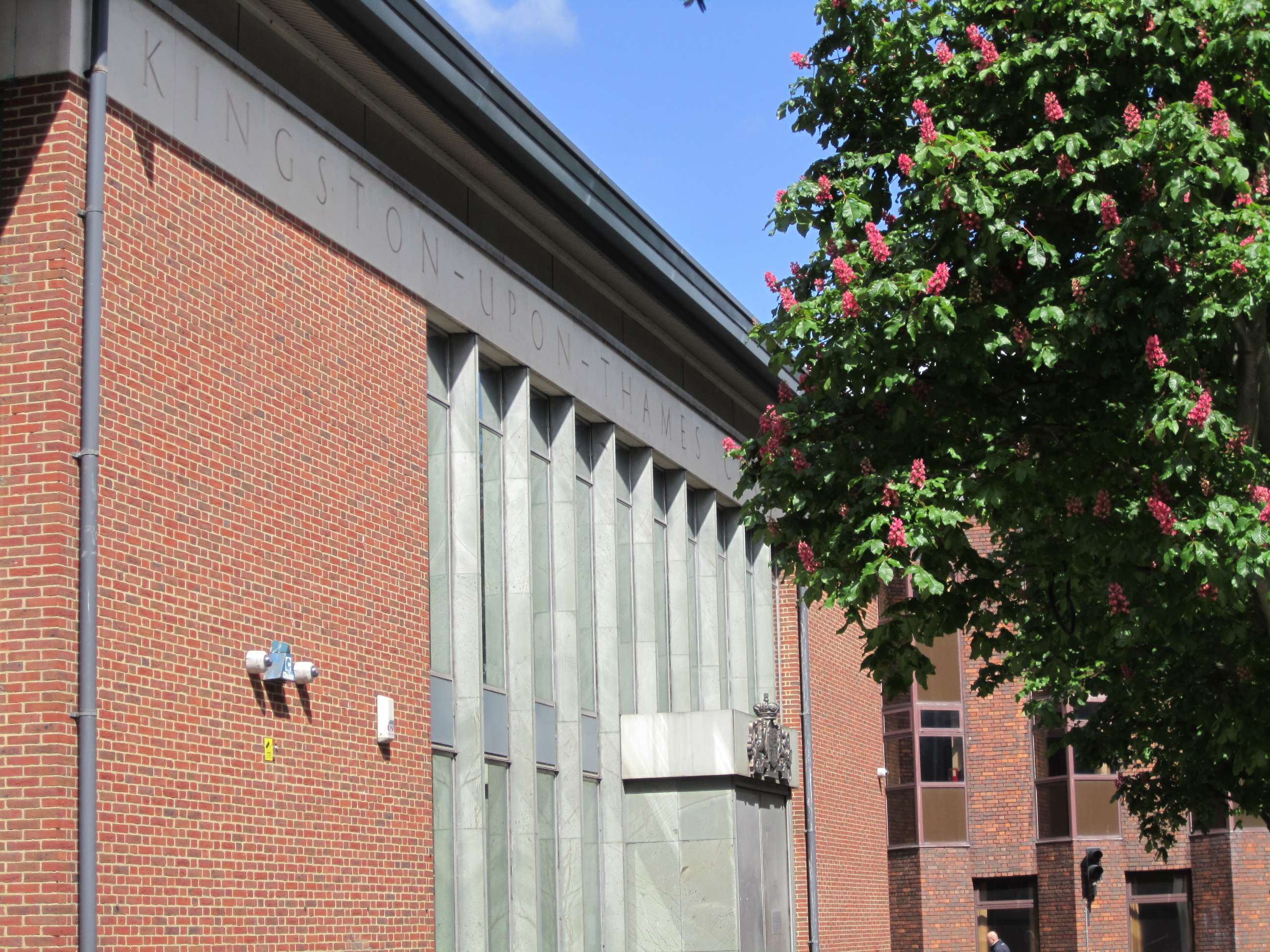
The façade of the Kingston County Court building showing the old spelling of the town's name.

== History ==
A map showing the wards of Kingston-upon-Thames Municipal Borough as they appeared in 1868.

The ancient borough of Kingston-upon-Thames received its charter in 1200 from King John. The borough corporation was reformed by the Municipal Corporations Act 1835. The ancient parish of Kingston-upon-Thames was much larger than the ancient borough. Through the gradual process of splitting off new parishes, the borough and parish became coterminous in 1894.

It formed part of the expanded Metropolitan Police District from 1840 and the London Traffic Area from 1924.

It was known as a Royal borough through ancient custom and the right to the title was confirmed by George V in 1927. The borough formed part of the London Passenger Transport Area from 1933.

It gained an area of 251 acres (1 km^{2}) in the north west from the abolition of Ham Urban District in 1933 and was affected by a minor exchange of territory with the Municipal Borough of Richmond in 1958.

The district was abolished in 1965 by the London Government Act 1963 and its former area was transferred to Greater London to be combined with that of the Municipal Borough of Malden and Coombe and the Municipal Borough of Surbiton to form the London Borough of Kingston upon Thames; with the status of Royal borough transferred to the new borough.

The borough's coat of arms was first registered in 1572. It was Azure three salmon naiant in pale argent. This coat of arms was re-adopted as that of the new London Borough of Kingston upon Thames in 1965, with the addition of a crest and supporters, and the changing of the colour of the fins of the three fishes from silver to red.
