= Sudbrook (stream) =

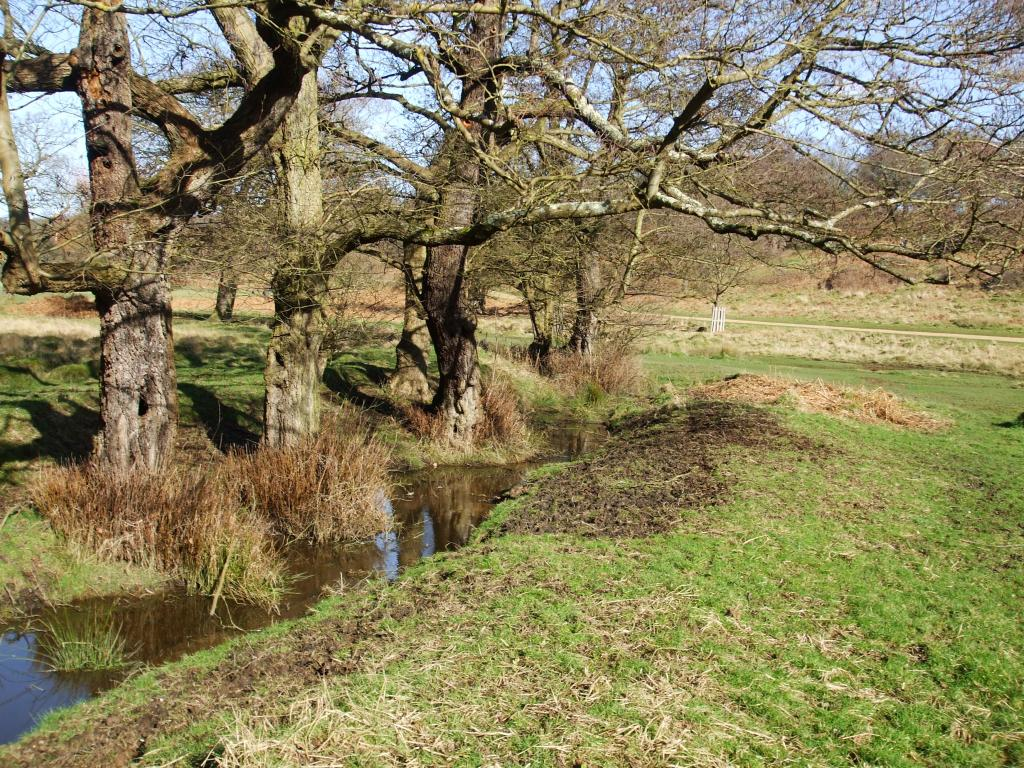
- Sudbrook, near Ham Gate and pond, Richmond Park

- Sudbrook outfall to the Thames at Petersham, London.
- Etymology: South Brook

Location
- Country: England, United Kingdom
- County: Greater London

Physical characteristics
- Source
  - location: Dann's Pond, Richmond Park, Greater London
  - coordinates: 51°25′40.74″N 0°16′47.64″W
- Mouth
  - location: Petersham Meadows, River Thames
  - coordinates: 51°26′55.34″N 0°18′20.88″W
  - elevation: 4.5 metres Above Ordnance Datum
- Length: 3.8 km (2.4 mi)

Basin features
- Tributaries
  - left: Latchmere Stream

Sudbrook and its tributary, the Latchmere stream, are north-flowing streams in London, England, that drain northern Kingston upon Thames and the eastern extreme of Ham following a meander scar in a terrace; the upper part of the Sudbrook drains a narrow vale in Richmond Park's southern corner into the tidal Thames.

== Sudbrook ==
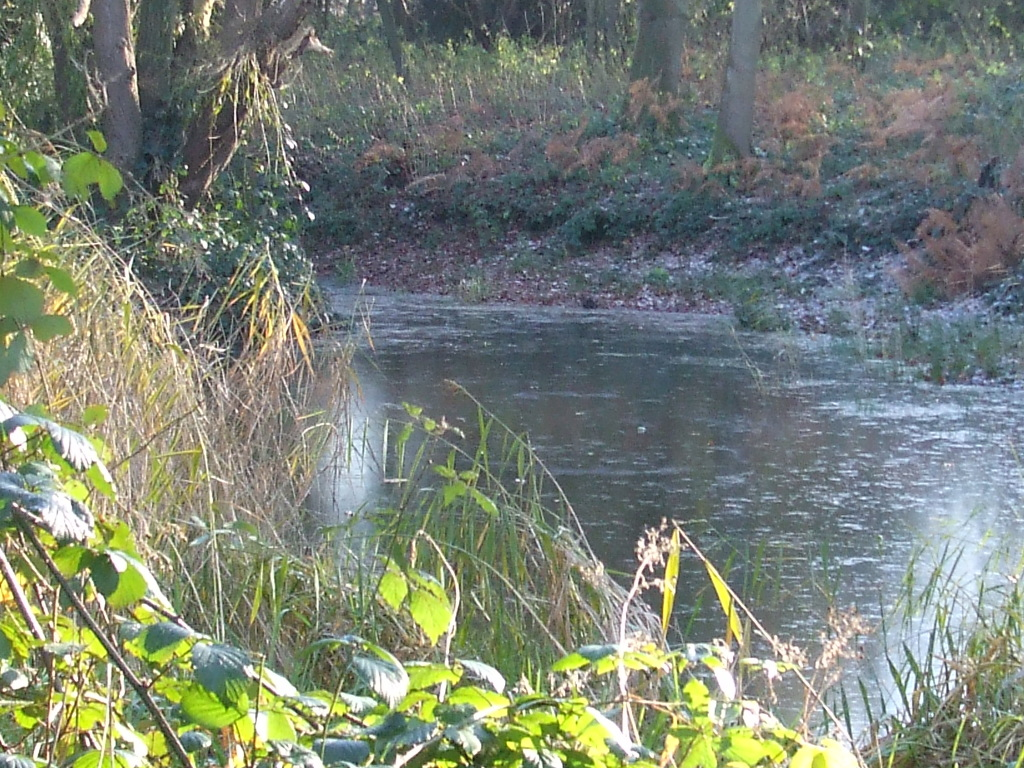
Dann's Pond, Richmond Park

The Sudbrook (from 'South brook') rises at the small pond south of Dann's Pond, at about 150 feet (46 m) elevation, in the far south of Richmond Park, flowing NNW to Ham Gate. It forms a small valley, Ham Dip, and has been dammed and enlarged in two places to form 'Ham Dip Pond' and 'Ham Gate Pond', first mapped in 1861 and 1754 respectively. These were created for the watering of deer. Both saw restoration including de-silting, completed in 2013. It drains the western escarpment of the hill that, to the east, forms part of the catchment of Beverley Brook and, to the south, the Hogsmill River.

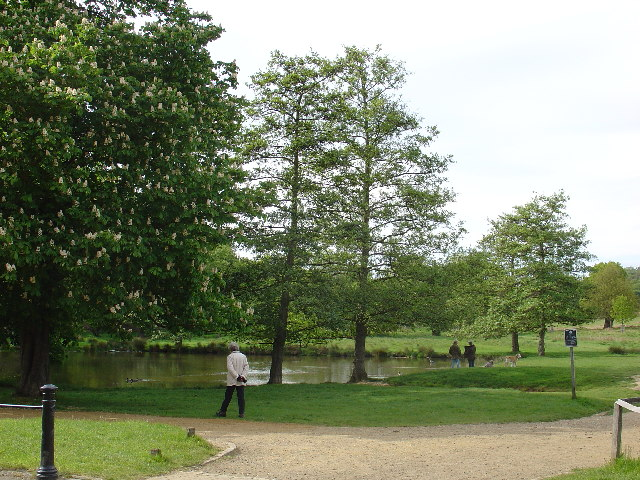
Ham Gate Pond, fed by Sudbrook

The Sudbrook is joined by the Latchmere stream just beyond Ham Gate Pond. It then flows into Sudbrook Park, Petersham, and is culverted for the remainder of its course, discharging into the tidal River Thames to the east of 'River Lane' where the culvert outfall is protected from tidal backflow by a flap valve.

Before culverting, the stream used to flow alongside the A307 road in Petersham and was crossed by a ford at Sudbrook Lane. The collapse of this culvert in the late 1970s, referred to as the Petersham Hole, caused widespread traffic disruption for over a year.

== Latchmere stream ==
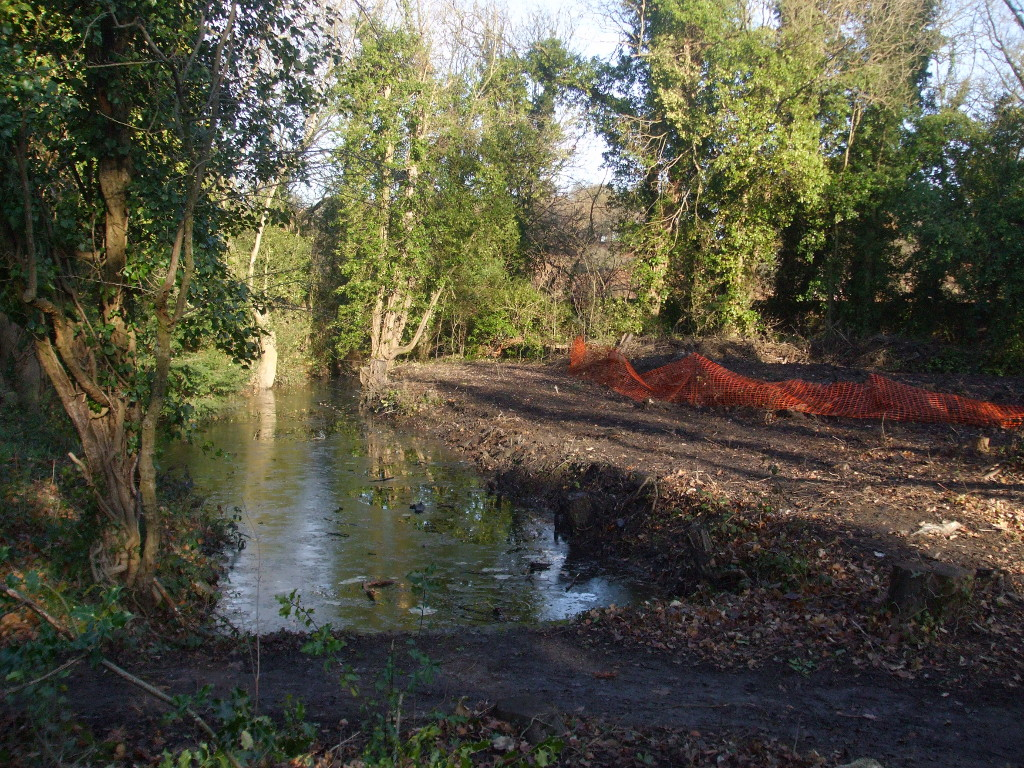
Latchmere stream outfall pond outside Ham Gate, Richmond Park, December 2012

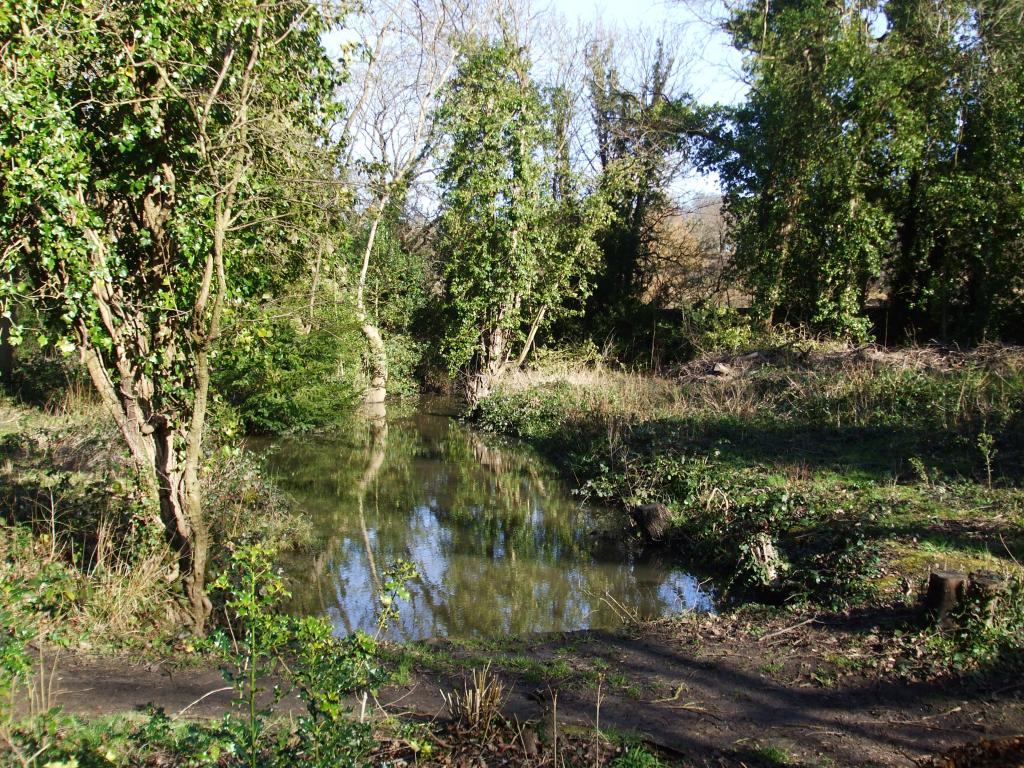
Latchmere stream outfall pond in February 2014

Latchmere probably combines Old French 'lache', lazy or slow-moving and Old English 'mere', a lake or pond; it may however relate to lammas land, a type of common land with church associations.

The Latchmere stream or Latchmere brook started as drainage ditches in the Canbury manor to the north-east of Kingston railway station that, historically in low gradient seasonally flooded. Flooding is abated by some drains in its catchment now draining to the Thames or Hogsmill River and by many soakaways for the roof of homes. Some surface water still drains north-east then north, added to by percolation of water in Richmond Park into the very small, hillside Gallows Pond. Exactly 305 metres of the south of the Kings Road forms its abrupt dip in Richmond Park's south-west side. Owing to flood deposition centuries ago of the untamed river Thames, the Thames/Latchmere watershed (divide), from the town northward shifts eastward e.g. is 220m from Richmond Road, as to Latchmere Road.

The stream's lower course lines the south of the east side of Ham Common, about 50 metres west of Ham Gate of the Richmond Park, via which it joins the Sudbrook just below Ham Gate Pond which together skirt the west side of the Park against the Common.

From Roman to Saxon England or later, the north of Kingston town centre formed a series of island fields formed by a branch of the Hogsmill River and a drainage channel linked to this stream.

With the increase of urbanisation of Kingston in the early 19th century, residents of Canbury used many of their ditches as open sewers, causing a public nuisance and a health hazard: The stench from this ditch, which is an open one, is always bad, but in summer it is beyond words to describe reported the Kingston Board of Guardians on 19 June 1866. This and other open sewers were the cause of serious public health problems, and by in the early 1890s a sewerage works served Kingston, on the Thames. However the slow brook, used as or percolating to the main source of water for a few, still caused some fatal infant diarrhoea and diphtheria. Public information not to drink from streams, ditches or shallow wells in urban zones was widespread by the early 20th century.

Expansion of residential housing across former agricultural land has resulted in the Latchmere stream being culverted, but its course is revealed during periods of heavy rainfall. Its streets are the subject of pluvial flood risk management.

Next confluence upstream	River Thames	Next confluence downstream
Hogsmill River (south)	Sudbrook (stream)	River Crane, London (north)
