= Richmond, Petersham and Ham Open Spaces Act 1902 =

United Kingdom legislation

- Act of Parliament
- Parliament of the United Kingdom
- Long title: An Act to confirm agreements for vesting common and other land in the local authorities of Richmond Ham and Kingston and Surrey County Council as public open spaces and for other purposes.
- Citation: 2 Edw. 7. c. ccliii
- Territorial extent: Richmond, Petersham, Ham, Kingston

Dates
- Royal assent: 18 November 1902
- Commencement: 18 November 1902

Status: Amended

Text of statute as originally enacted

The Richmond, Petersham and Ham Open Spaces Act 1902 (2 Edw. 7. c. ccliii) was enacted to protect the view from Richmond Hill, London.

Ham and Petersham commons and certain meadows and manorial rights in the same were vested in the Richmond Corporation for purposes of public enjoyment. The Lammas rights on part of the manor were also, by the same act, taken from the commoners who had enjoyed rights of pasture. The riverside, from Petersham to Kingston, was put under the Richmond Corporation and the Surrey County Council, in two sections, for enjoyment by the public for ever.

An initial bill, The Petersham and Ham Lands Footpaths Bill presented by Lord Dysart in 1896, sought to enclose 176 acres (71 ha) of Lammas lands. It was defeated by 262 votes to 118 as it was deemed to contravene the Metropolitan Commons Acts 1866 to 1878.

The act itself details that, in December 1896, the Board of Agriculture was invited to consider a scheme for the Lammas lands under the Metropolitan Commons Acts. The board determined that the provisions of the acts did not apply in this case.

A few years later, the private bill, the Richmond Hill (Preservation of View) Bill, passed through the committee stage. This bill contained the same proposals but more concessions than its predecessor, and focused more on the preservation of the view from Richmond Hill. It was challenged, unsuccessfully, in the House of Commons with votes divided 179 in favour of the bill to 79 against. Despite the earlier ruling by the Board of Agriculture, the Attorney-General Sir Robert Finlay definitively advised the House of Lords that the Metropolitan Commons Acts did apply to the Lammas lands and thus those laws would need to be overlooked for the bill to pass.

The Richmond, Petersham and Ham Open Spaces Act 1902 gained royal assent on 18 November 1902.

The act was proposed to be amended by clause 20 of the bill leading to the Greater London Council (General Powers) Act 1982.
