= Ham Urban District =

Former local government area in the UK

Coordinates: 51.43°N 0.30°W

Ham
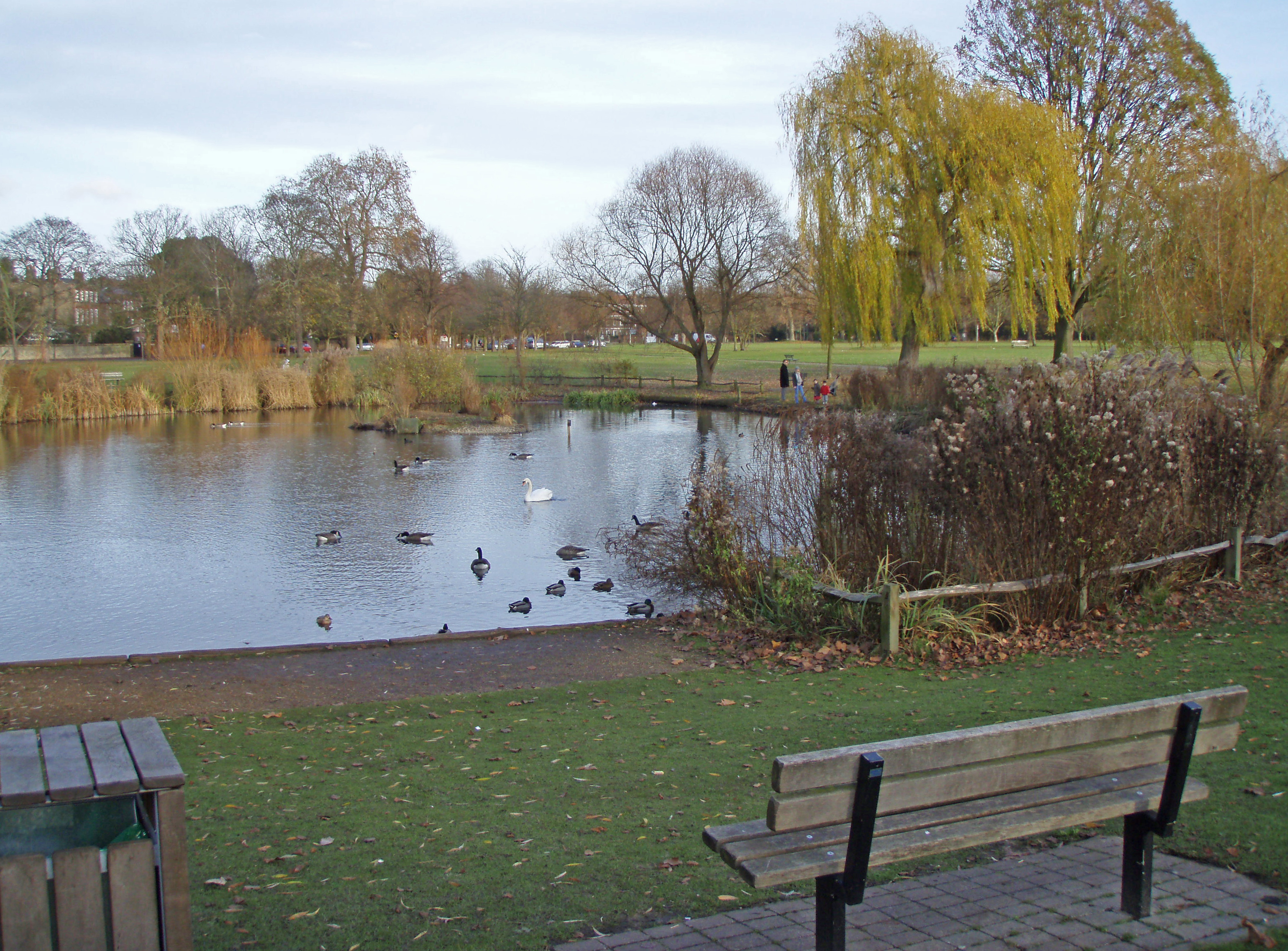
- Ham Pond, Ham Common
- Area
  - 1911: 1,871 acres (7.6 km^{2})
  - 1931: 1,869 acres (7.6 km^{2})
- Population
  - 1901: 1,460
  - 1931: 2,206
- History
  - Origin: Ham Common Local Government District
  - Created: 1894
  - Abolished: 1933
  - Succeeded by: Municipal Borough of Richmond
- Status: Urban district

Ham was a local government district in north east Surrey, England, around the village of Ham from 1894 to 1933.

Ham Common Local Government District was formed under the Local Government Act 1858 and was governed by a local board of eight members. The Local Government Act 1894 reconstituted the area as Ham Urban District, with an elected urban district council of 10 members replacing the local board. The urban district consisted of the civil parish of Ham with Hatch, renamed as "Ham" in 1897.

The urban district was abolished in 1933, when a county review order included its area in an enlarged Municipal Borough of Richmond.

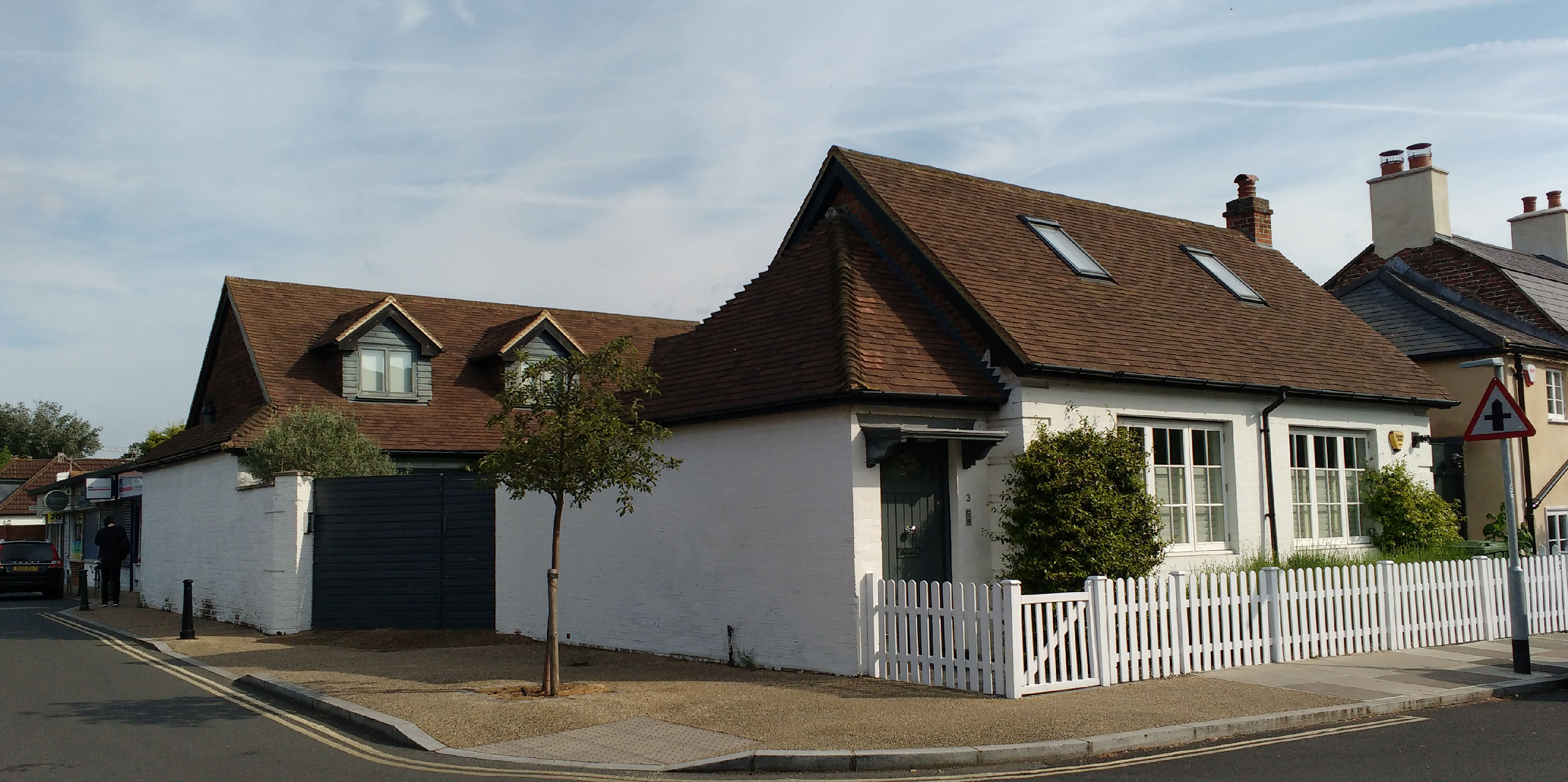
The former Ham UDC offices in Lock Road

Since 1965 Ham has been part of the London Borough of Richmond upon Thames.
